= Membrane mirror =

Artist's conception of membrane mirror closed (right) and opened. (US Air Force image)

Membrane mirrors are mirrors made on thin films of material, such as metallized PET film. They can be used as components in adaptive optics systems.

== See also ==
- Solar sail
