= Aft-crossing trajectory =

Flight path for launching satellite

In 2005, a new trajectory that an air-launched rocket could take to put satellites into orbit was tested. Until this time, launch vehicles such as the Pegasus rocket, or rocket planes such as the X-1, X-15, or SpaceShipOne, which were carried under an aircraft pointing in the same direction as the fuselage, would have their engines ignited either just before being air-dropped or a few seconds afterward. They would then be expected to accelerate and climb in front of the carrier aircraft, crossing its flight path. This was considered dangerous due to the potential for a crashes between the rocket and the launch vehicle.

The aft-crossing trajectory is an alternate flight path for a rocket. The rocket's rotation (induced by the deployment from the aircraft) is slowed by a small parachute attached to its tail, then ignited once the carrier aircraft has passed it. It is ignited before it is pointing fully vertically, however it will turn to do so, and accelerates to pass behind the carrier aircraft.

The principal advantage of this method is its safety for the crew of the carrier aircraft.

== See also ==
- AirLaunch LLC
- t/Space
