= Dual mode propulsion rocket =

Dual-mode propulsion systems combine the high efficiency of bipropellant rockets with the reliability and simplicity of monopropellant rockets.

Dual mode systems are either hydrazine/nitrogen tetroxide or monomethylhydrazine/hydrogen peroxide (the former is much more common). Typically, this system works as follows: During the initial high-impulse orbit-raising maneuvers, the system operates in a bipropellant fashion, providing high thrust at higher specific impulse; when it arrives on orbit, it closes off either the fuel or oxidizer and conducts the remainder of its mission in a simple, predictable monopropellant fashion.

== See also ==
- Propulsion system
- Spacecraft propulsion
