= Slew (spacecraft) =

Spacecraft orientation

The slew of a spacecraft is its orientation in reference to a plane or fixed position such as Earth, the Sun, another celestial body or other point in space. When moving to assume such an orientation, the spacecraft is slewing.

During spaceflight, a craft's attitude must be controlled for reasons depending on the craft's mission. Keeping a spacecraft slewed properly is vital for ensuring that its antenna remains oriented toward Earth for sending and receiving data and commands. Additionally with many craft, keeping their solar arrays angled toward the Sun optimizes their power absorption and reduces the craft's reliance on internal power systems. Thermal heating and cooling of a craft and its subsystems can also be controlled by the craft's orientation. Cameras or other sensing equipment that are fixed into position upon the craft need to be aimed by slewing the craft. A spacecraft can either be spin stabilized or 3-axis stabilized to maintain proper orientation.

For spin-stabilized spacecraft, slewing is accomplished by applying a (significant) torque to the spacecraft, in general by operating a thruster in synchronous or asynchronous direction to its spin to adjust its spin rate. This results in a precession and slews for this kind of spacecraft are therefore also called "precession manoeuvre."

The slew of 3-axis stabilized spacecraft is typically in closed loop control with thrusters or electrically-powered reaction wheels maintaining or altering the craft's attitude based on sensor measurements. A typical example is a space telescope that should be turned to observe a new celestial object. But also for 3-axis stabilized spacecraft for which the normal attitude is not inertially fixed the spacecraft is said to make a slew if the attitude is changed in another way and with another, mostly higher, rate than when in the basic attitude control mode. An example is the Magellan probe that once per orbit interrupted the scanning of the Venus surface making a large turn to direct its high gain antenna to the Earth for data transmission.

== See also ==
- Attitude control (spacecraft)
- Flight dynamics (spacecraft)
- Reaction control system
