= Transfer orbit =

Elliptical orbit used to move a spacecraft from one circular orbit to another

In orbital mechanics, a transfer orbit is an intermediate elliptical orbit that is used to move a spacecraft in an orbital maneuver from one circular, or largely circular, orbit to another.

There are several types of transfer orbits, which vary in their energy efficiency and speed of transfer. These include:

- Hohmann transfer orbit, an elliptical orbit used to transfer a spacecraft between two circular orbits of different altitudes in the same plane
- Bi-elliptic transfer, a slower method of transfer, but one that may be more efficient than a Hohmann transfer orbit
- Geostationary transfer orbit or geosynchronous transfer orbit is usually also a Hohmann transfer orbit
- Lunar transfer orbit is an orbit that touches Low Earth orbit and a lunar orbit.
