= Delta-v budget =

Estimate of total change in velocity of a space mission

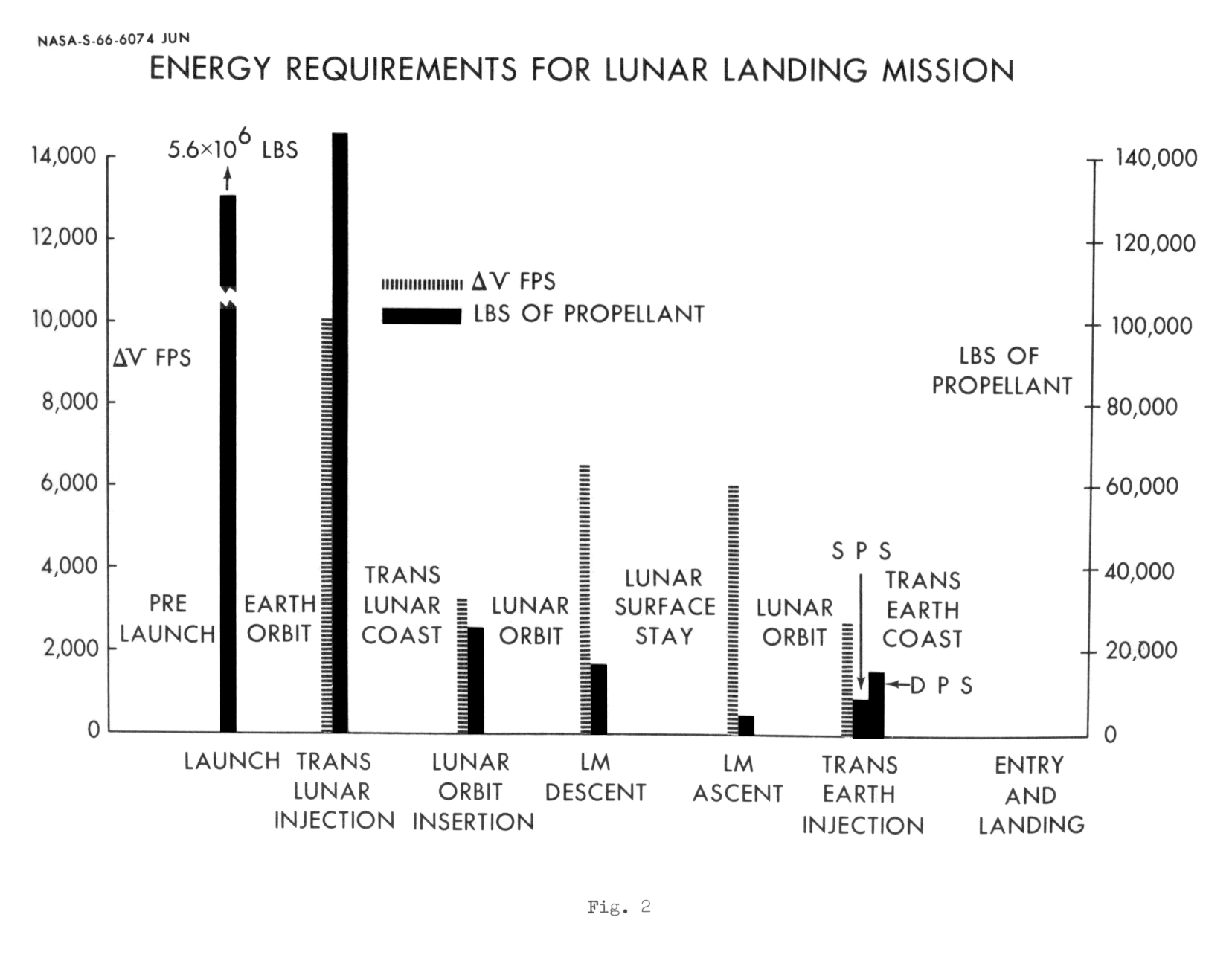
Delta-v in feet per second, and fuel requirements for a typical Apollo Lunar Landing mission.

In astrodynamics and aerospace, a delta-v budget is an estimate of the total change in velocity (delta-v) required for a space mission. It is calculated as the sum of the delta-v required to perform each propulsive maneuver needed during the mission. As input to the Tsiolkovsky rocket equation, it determines how much propellant is required for a vehicle of given empty mass and propulsion system.

Delta-v is a scalar quantity dependent only on the desired trajectory and not on the mass of the space vehicle. For example, although more fuel is needed to transfer a heavier communication satellite from low Earth orbit to geosynchronous orbit than for a lighter one, the delta-v required is the same. Delta-v is also additive, as contrasted to rocket burn time, the latter having greater effect later in the mission when more fuel has been used up.

Tables of the delta-v required to move between different space regime are useful in the conceptual planning of space missions. In the absence of an atmosphere, the delta-v is typically the same for changes in orbit in either direction; in particular, gaining and losing speed cost an equal effort. An atmosphere can be used to slow a spacecraft by aerobraking.

A typical delta-v budget might enumerate various classes of maneuvers, delta-v per maneuver, and number of each maneuver required over the life of the mission, then simply sum the total delta-v, much like a typical financial budget. Because the delta-v needed to achieve the mission usually varies with the relative position of the gravitating bodies, launch windows are often calculated from porkchop plots that show delta-v plotted against the launch time.

== General principles ==
The Tsiolkovsky rocket equation shows that the delta-v of a rocket (stage) is proportional to the logarithm of the fuelled-to-empty mass ratio of the vehicle, and to the specific impulse of the rocket engine. A key goal in designing space-mission trajectories is to minimize the required delta-v to reduce the size and expense of the rocket that would be needed to successfully deliver any particular payload to its destination.

The simplest delta-v budget can be calculated with Hohmann transfer, which moves from one circular orbit to another coplanar circular orbit via an elliptical transfer orbit. In some cases a bi-elliptic transfer can give a lower delta-v.

Hohmann transfer orbit, labelled 2, from an orbit (1) to a higher orbit (3). This is a very commonly used maneuver between orbits.

A more complex transfer occurs when the orbits are not coplanar. In that case there is an additional delta-v necessary to change the plane of the orbit. The velocity of the vehicle needs substantial burns at the intersection of the two orbital planes and the delta-v is usually extremely high. However, these plane changes can be almost free in some cases if the gravity and mass of a planetary body are used to perform the deflection. In other cases, boosting up to a relatively high altitude apoapsis gives low speed before performing the plane change, thus requiring lower total delta-v.

The slingshot effect can be used to give a boost of speed/energy; if a vehicle goes past a planetary or lunar body, it is possible to pick up (or lose) some of that body's orbital velocity relative to the Sun or another planet.

Another effect is the Oberth effect—this can be used to greatly decrease the amount of fuel needed to achieve a given delta-v, because using propellant at low potential energy/high speed multiplies the effect of a burn. Thus for example the delta-v for a Hohmann transfer from Earth's orbital radius to Mars's orbital radius (to overcome the Sun's gravity) is many kilometres per second, but the incremental burn from low Earth orbit (LEO) over and above the burn to overcome Earth's gravity is far less if the burn is done close to Earth than if the burn to reach a Mars transfer orbit is performed at Earth's orbit, but far away from Earth.

A less used effect is low energy transfers. These are highly nonlinear effects that work by orbital resonances and by choosing trajectories close to Lagrange points. They can be very slow, but use very little delta-v.

Because delta-v depends on the position and motion of celestial bodies, particularly when using the slingshot effect and Oberth effect, the delta-v budget changes with launch time. These can be plotted on a porkchop plot.

Course corrections usually also require some propellant budget. Propulsion systems never provide precisely the right propulsion in precisely the right direction at all times, and navigation also introduces some uncertainty. Some propellant needs to be reserved to correct variations from the optimum trajectory.

== Budget ==
Map of the needed delta-v to travel directly (without gravity assist) to the main bodies in the Solar System (assuming burns are at periapsis, and inclination changes are ignored)

=== Launch/landing ===
The delta-v requirements for sub-orbital spaceflight are much lower than for orbital spaceflight. For the Ansari X Prize altitude of 100 km, Space Ship One required a delta-v of roughly 1.4 km/s. To reach the initial low Earth orbit of the International Space Station of 300 km (now 400 km), the delta-v is over six times higher, about 9.4 km/s. Because of the exponential nature of the rocket equation the orbital rocket needs to be considerably bigger.

- Launch to LEO—this not only requires an increase of velocity from 0 to 7.8 km/s, but also typically 1.5–2 km/s for atmospheric drag and gravity drag
- Re-entry from LEO—the delta-v required is the orbital maneuvering burn to lower perigee into the atmosphere, atmospheric drag takes care of the rest.

=== Earth–Moon space—high thrust ===
Delta-v needed to move inside the Earth–Moon system (speeds lower than escape velocity) are given in km/s. This table assumes that the Oberth effect is being used—this is possible with high thrust chemical propulsion but not with current (as of 2018) electrical propulsion.

The return to LEO figures assume that a heat shield and aerobraking/aerocapture are used to reduce the speed by up to 3.2 km/s. The heat shield increases the mass, possibly by 15%. Where a heat shield is not used the higher "from LEO" Delta-v figure applies. The extra propellant needed to replace the aerobraking is likely to be heavier than a heat shield. LEO-Ken refers to a low Earth orbit with an inclination to the equator of 28 degrees, corresponding to a launch from Kennedy Space Center. LEO-Eq is an equatorial orbit.

q	LEO-Ken	LEO-Eq	GEO	EML-1	EML-2	EML-4/5	LLO	Moon	C3=0
Earth	9.3–10								
Low Earth orbit (LEO-Ken)		4.24	4.33	3.77	3.43	3.97	4.04	5.93	3.22
Low Earth orbit (LEO-Eq)	4.24		3.90	3.77	3.43	3.99	4.04	5.93	3.22
Geostationary orbit (GEO)	2.06	1.63		1.38	1.47	1.71	2.05	3.92	1.30
Lagrangian point 1 (EML-1)	0.77	0.77	1.38		0.14	0.33	0.64	2.52	0.14
Lagrangian point 2 (EML-2)	0.33	0.33	1.47	0.14		0.34	0.64	2.52	0.14
Lagrangian point 4/5 (EML-4/5)	0.84	0.98	1.71	0.33	0.34		0.98	2.58	0.43
Low lunar orbit (LLO)	0.90	0.90	2.05	0.64	0.65	0.98		1.87	1.40
Moon surface	2.74	2.74	3.92	2.52	2.53	2.58	1.87		2.80
Earth escape velocity (C3=0)	0	0	1.30	0.14	0.14	0.43	1.40	2.80	

=== Earth–Moon space—low thrust ===
Current electric ion thrusters produce a very low thrust (milli-newtons, yielding a small fraction of a g), so the Oberth effect cannot normally be used. This results in the journey requiring a higher delta-v and frequently a large increase in time compared to a high thrust chemical rocket. Nonetheless, the high specific impulse of electrical thrusters may significantly reduce the cost of the flight. For missions in the Earth–Moon system, an increase in journey time from days to months could be unacceptable for human space flight, but differences in flight time for interplanetary flights are less significant and could be favorable.

The table below presents delta-v's in km/s, normally accurate to 2 significant figures and will be the same in both directions, unless aerobraking is used as described in the high thrust section above.

From	To	Delta-v (km/s)
Low Earth orbit (LEO)	Earth–Moon Lagrangian 1 (EML-1)	7.0
Low Earth orbit (LEO)	Geostationary Earth orbit (GEO)	6.0
Low Earth orbit (LEO)	Low Lunar orbit (LLO)	8.0
Low Earth orbit (LEO)	Sun–Earth Lagrangian 1 (SEL-1)	7.4
Low Earth orbit (LEO)	Sun–Earth Lagrangian 2 (SEL-2)	7.4
Earth–Moon Lagrangian 1 (EML-1)	Low Lunar orbit (LLO)	0.60–0.80
Earth–Moon Lagrangian 1 (EML-1)	Geostationary Earth orbit (GEO)	1.4–1.75
Earth–Moon Lagrangian 1 (EML-1)	Sun-Earth Lagrangian 2 (SEL-2)	0.30–0.40

=== Earth Lunar Gateway—high thrust ===
The Lunar Gateway space station was planned to be deployed in a highly elliptical seven-day near-rectilinear halo orbit (NRHO) around the Moon. Spacecraft launched from Earth would have performed a powered flyby of the Moon followed by a NRHO orbit insertion burn to dock with the Gateway as it would have approached the apoapsis point of its orbit.

However, on March 24th, 2026, the plans for lunar gateway were cancelled.

From	To	Delta-v (km/s)
Low Earth orbit (LEO)	Trans-Lunar Injection (TLI)	3.20
Trans-Lunar Injection (TLI)	Low (polar) lunar orbit (LLO)	0.90
Trans-Lunar Injection (TLI)	Lunar Gateway	0.43
Lunar Gateway	Low (polar) lunar orbit	0.73
Low (polar) lunar orbit	Lunar Gateway	0.73
Lunar Gateway	Earth Interface (EI)	0.41

=== Interplanetary ===
The spacecraft is assumed to be using chemical propulsion and the Oberth effect.

From	To	Delta-v (km/s)
LEO	Mars transfer orbit	4.3 ("typical", not minimal)
Earth escape velocity (C3=0)	Mars transfer orbit	0.6
Mars transfer orbit	Mars capture orbit	0.9
Mars capture orbit	Deimos transfer orbit	0.2
Deimos transfer orbit	Deimos surface	0.7
Deimos transfer orbit	Phobos transfer orbit	0.3
Phobos transfer orbit	Phobos surface	0.5
Mars capture orbit	Low Mars orbit	1.4
Low Mars orbit	Mars surface	4.1
Earth–Moon Lagrange point 2	Mars transfer orbit	<1.0
Mars transfer orbit	Low Mars orbit	2.7 (not minimal)
Earth escape velocity (C3=0)	Closest NEO	0.8–2.0

According to Marsden and Ross, "The energy levels of the Sun–Earth L_{1} and L_{2} points differ from those of the Earth–Moon system by only 50 m/s (as measured by maneuver velocity)."

We may apply the formula
$$\Delta v
= \sqrt{\frac{\mu}{r_1}}
\left( \sqrt{\frac{2 r_2}{r_1+r_2}} - 1 \right)$$
(where μ = GM is the standard gravitational parameter of the sun, see Hohmann transfer orbit) to calculate the Δv in km/s needed to arrive at various destinations from Earth (assuming circular orbits for the planets, and using perihelion distance for Pluto). In this table, the column labeled "Δv to enter Hohmann orbit from Earth's orbit" gives the change from Earth's velocity to the velocity needed to get on a Hohmann ellipse whose other end will be at the desired distance from the Sun. The column labeled "v exiting LEO" gives the velocity needed (in a non-rotating frame of reference centred on Earth) when 300 km above Earth's surface. This is obtained by adding to the specific kinetic energy the square of the speed (7.73 km/s) of this low Earth orbit (that is, the depth of Earth's gravity well at this LEO). The column "Δv from LEO" is simply the previous speed minus 7.73 km/s. The transit time is calculated as $((1+\text{orbital radius})/2)^{3/2}/2$ years.

Note that the values in the table only give the Δv needed to get to the orbital distance of the planet. The speed relative to the planet will still be considerable, and in order to go into orbit around the planet either aerocapture is needed using the planet's atmosphere, or more Δv is needed.

Destination	Orbital radius (AU)	Δv to enter Hohmann orbit from Earth's orbit	Δv exiting LEO	Δv from LEO	Transit time
Sun	0	29.8	31.7	24.0	2.1 months
Mercury	0.39	7.5	13.3	5.5	3.5 months
Venus	0.72	2.5	11.2	3.5	4.8 months
Mars	1.52	2.9	11.3	3.6	8.5 months
Jupiter	5.2	8.8	14.0	6.3	2.7 years
Saturn	9.54	10.3	15.0	7.3	6.0 years
Uranus	19.19	11.3	15.7	8.0	16.0 years
Neptune	30.07	11.7	16.0	8.2	30.6 years
Pluto	29.66 (perih.)	11.6	16.0	8.2	45.5 years
1 light-year	63,241	12.3	16.5	8.8	2.8 million years

The New Horizons space probe to Pluto achieved a near-Earth speed of over 16 km/s which was enough to escape from the Sun. (It also got a boost from a fly-by of Jupiter.)

To get to the Sun, it is actually not necessary to use a Δv of 24 km/s. One can use 8.8 km/s to go very far away from the Sun, then use a negligible Δv to bring the angular momentum to zero, and then fall into the Sun. This sequence of two Hohmann transfers, one up and one down, is a special case of a bi-elliptic transfer. Also, the table does not give the values that would apply when using the Moon for a gravity assist. There are also possibilities of using one planet, like Venus which is the easiest to get to, to assist getting to other planets or the Sun. The Galileo spacecraft used Venus once and Earth twice in order to reach Jupiter. The Ulysses solar probe used Jupiter to attain polar orbit around the Sun.

=== Delta-vs between Earth, Moon and Mars ===

Delta-v needed for various orbital manoeuvers using conventional rockets.

Abbreviations key

- Escape orbits with low pericentre – C3 = 0
- Geostationary orbit – GEO
- Geostationary transfer orbit – GTO
- Earth–Moon L_{5} Lagrangian point – L5
- Low Earth orbit – LEO
- Lunar orbit means low lunar orbit
- Red arrows show where optional aerobraking/aerocapture can be performed in that particular direction, black numbers give delta-v in km/s that apply in either direction. Lower-delta-v transfers than shown can often be achieved, but involve rare transfer windows or take significantly longer, see: fuzzy orbital transfers.
- Electric propulsion vehicles going from Mars C3 = 0 to Earth C3 = 0 without using the Oberth effect need a larger Delta-v of between 2.6 km/s and 3.15 km/s. Not all possible links are shown.
- The Delta-v for C3 = 0 to Mars transfer must be applied at pericentre, i.e. immediately after accelerating to the escape trajectory, and do not agree with the formula above which gives 0.4 from Earth escape and 0.65 from Mars escape.
- The figures for LEO to GTO, GTO to GEO, and LEO to GEO are inconsistent. (Note: The sum of LEO to GTO and GTO to GEO should equal LEO to GEO. The precise figures depend on what low Earth orbit is used. According to Geostationary transfer orbit, the speed of a GTO at perigee can be just 9.8 km/s. This corresponds to an LEO at about 700 km altitude, where its speed would be 7.5 km/s, giving a delta-v of 2.3 km/s. Starting from a lower LEO would require more delta-v to get to GTO, but then the total for LEO to GEO would have to be higher.) The figure of 30 for LEO to the Sun is also too high. (Note: Earth's speed in its orbit around the Sun is, on average, 29.78 km/s, equivalent to a specific kinetic energy of 443 km^{2}/s^{2}. One must add to this the potential energy depth of LEO, about 61 km^{2}/s^{2}, to give a kinetic energy close to Earth of 504 km^{2}/s^{2}, corresponding to a speed of 31.8 km/s. Since the LEO speed is 7.8 km/s, the delta-v is only 24 km/s. It would be possible to reach the Sun with less delta-v using gravity assists. See Parker Solar Probe. It is also possible to take the long route of going far away from the sun (Δv 8.8 km/s) and then using a very small Δv to cancel the angular momentum and fall into the Sun.)

=== Near-Earth objects ===
Near-Earth objects are asteroids whose orbits can bring them within about 0.3 astronomical units of the Earth. There are thousands of such objects that are easier to reach than the Moon or Mars. Their one-way delta-v budgets from LEO range upwards from 3.8 km/s (12,000 ft/s), which is less than 2/3 of the delta-v needed to reach the Moon's surface. But NEOs with low delta-v budgets have long synodic periods, and the intervals between times of closest approach to the Earth (and thus most efficient missions) can be decades long.

The delta-v required to return from Near-Earth objects is usually quite small, sometimes as low as 60 m/s (200 ft/s), with aerocapture using Earth's atmosphere. However, heat shields are required for this, which add mass and constrain spacecraft geometry. The orbital phasing can be problematic; once rendezvous has been achieved, low delta-v return windows can be fairly far apart (more than a year, often many years), depending on the body.

In general, bodies that are much further away or closer to the Sun than Earth, have more frequent windows for travel, but usually require larger delta-vs.

== See also ==
- Bi-elliptic transfer
- Gravity assist
- Hohmann transfer
- Oberth effect
- Orbital speed
- Tsiolkovsky rocket equation
- Porkchop plot
- Synodic period
