= Orbital mechanics =

Field of classical mechanics concerned with the motion of spacecraft

External videos
- Space Flight: The Application of Orbital Mechanics by NASA
- YouTube / NASA STI Program

A satellite orbiting Earth has a tangential velocity and an inward acceleration.

Orbital mechanics , astrodynamics or space dynamics is the application of ballistics and celestial mechanics to rockets, satellites, and other spacecraft. The motion of these objects is usually calculated from laws of motion and of universal gravitation derived by Isaac Newton. Astrodynamics is a core discipline within space-mission design and control.

Celestial mechanics treats more broadly the orbit dynamics of systems under the influence of gravity, including both spacecraft and natural astronomical bodies such as star systems, planets, moons, and comets. Orbital mechanics focuses on spacecraft trajectories, including orbital maneuvers, orbital plane changes, and interplanetary transfers, and is used by mission planners to predict the results of propulsive maneuvers.

General relativity is a more exact theory than Newton's laws for calculating orbits, and it is sometimes necessary to use it for greater accuracy or in high-gravity situations (e.g. orbits near the Sun).

== History ==
Until the rise of space travel in the twentieth century, there was little distinction between orbital and celestial mechanics. At the time of Sputnik, the field was termed space dynamics. The fundamental techniques, such as those used to solve the Keplerian problem (determining position as a function of time), are therefore the same in both fields. Furthermore, the history of the fields is almost entirely shared.

Johannes Kepler was the first to successfully model planetary orbits to a high degree of accuracy, publishing his laws in 1609. Isaac Newton published more general laws of celestial motion in the first edition of Philosophiæ Naturalis Principia Mathematica (1687), which gave a method for finding the orbit of a body following a parabolic path from three observations. This was used by Edmund Halley to establish the orbits of various comets, including that which bears his name. Newton's method of successive approximation was formalised into an analytic method by Leonhard Euler in 1744, whose work was in turn generalised to elliptical and hyperbolic orbits by Johann Lambert in 1761–1777.

Another milestone in orbit determination was Carl Friedrich Gauss's assistance in the "recovery" of the dwarf planet Ceres in 1801. Gauss's method was able to use just three observations (in the form of pairs of right ascension and declination), to find the six orbital elements that completely describe an orbit. The theory of orbit determination has subsequently been developed to the point where today it is applied in GPS receivers as well as the tracking and cataloguing of newly observed minor planets. Modern orbit determination and prediction are used to operate all types of satellites and space probes, as it is necessary to know their future positions to a high degree of accuracy.

Astrodynamics was developed by astronomer Samuel Herrick beginning in the 1930s. He consulted the rocket scientist Robert Goddard and was encouraged to continue his work on space navigation techniques, as Goddard believed they would be needed in the future. Numerical techniques of astrodynamics were coupled with new powerful computers in the 1960s, and humans were ready to travel to the Moon and return.

== Practical techniques ==
=== Rules of thumb ===
The following rules of thumb are useful for situations approximated by classical mechanics under the standard assumptions of astrodynamics outlined below. The specific example discussed is of a satellite orbiting a planet, but the rules of thumb could also apply to other situations, such as orbits of small bodies around a star such as the Sun.

- Kepler's laws of planetary motion:
  - Orbits are elliptical, with the more massive body at one focus of the ellipse. A special case of this is a circular orbit (a circle is a special case of ellipse) with the planet at the center.
  - A line drawn from the planet to the satellite sweeps out equal areas in equal times no matter which portion of the orbit is measured.
  - The square of a satellite's orbital period is proportional to the cube of its average distance from the planet.
- Without applying force (such as firing a rocket engine), the period and shape of the satellite's orbit will not change.
- A satellite in a low orbit (or a low part of an elliptical orbit) moves more quickly with respect to the surface of the planet than a satellite in a higher orbit (or a high part of an elliptical orbit), due to the stronger gravitational attraction closer to the planet.
- If thrust is applied at only one point in the satellite's orbit, it will return to that same point on each subsequent orbit, though the rest of its path will change. Thus one cannot move from one circular orbit to another with only one brief application of thrust.
- From a circular orbit, thrust applied in a direction opposite to the satellite's motion changes the orbit to an elliptical one; the satellite will descend and reach the lowest orbital point (the periapse) at 180 degrees away from the firing point; then it will ascend back. The period of the resultant orbit will be less than that of the original circular orbit. Thrust applied in the direction of the satellite's motion creates an elliptical orbit with its highest point (apoapse) 180 degrees away from the firing point. The period of the resultant orbit will be longer than that of the original circular orbit.

The consequences of the rules of orbital mechanics are sometimes counter-intuitive. For example, if two spacecraft are in the same circular orbit and wish to dock, the trailing craft cannot simply fire its engines to accelerate towards the leading craft. This will change the shape of its orbit, causing it to gain altitude and slow down relative to the leading craft, thus moving away from the target. The space rendezvous before docking normally takes multiple precisely calculated engine firings in multiple orbital periods, requiring hours or even days to complete.

To the extent that the standard assumptions of astrodynamics do not hold, actual trajectories will vary from those calculated. For example, simple atmospheric drag is another complicating factor for objects in low Earth orbit.

These rules of thumb are decidedly inaccurate when describing two or more bodies of similar mass, such as a binary star system (see n-body problem). Celestial mechanics uses more general rules applicable to a wider variety of situations. Kepler's laws of planetary motion, which can be mathematically derived from Newton's laws, hold strictly only in describing the motion of two gravitating bodies in the absence of non-gravitational forces; they also describe parabolic and hyperbolic trajectories. In the close proximity of large objects like stars the differences between classical mechanics and general relativity also become important.

== Laws of astrodynamics ==
The fundamental laws of astrodynamics are Newton's law of universal gravitation and Newton's laws of motion, while the fundamental mathematical tool is differential calculus.

In a Newtonian framework, the laws governing orbits and trajectories are in principle time-symmetric.

Standard assumptions in astrodynamics include non-interference from outside bodies, negligible mass for one of the bodies, and negligible other forces (such as from the solar wind, atmospheric drag, etc.). More accurate calculations can be made without these simplifying assumptions, but they are more complicated. The increased accuracy often does not make enough of a difference in the calculation to be worthwhile.

Kepler's laws of planetary motion may be derived from Newton's laws, when it is assumed that the orbiting body is subject only to the gravitational force of the central attractor. When an engine thrust or propulsive force is present, Newton's laws still apply, but Kepler's laws are invalidated. When the thrust stops, the resulting orbit will be different but will once again be described by Kepler's laws which have been set out above. The three laws are:

1. The orbit of every planet is an ellipse with the Sun at one of the foci.
2. A line joining a planet and the Sun sweeps out equal areas during equal intervals of time.
3. The squares of the orbital periods of planets are directly proportional to the cubes of the semi-major axis of the orbits.

=== Escape velocity ===
The formula for an escape velocity is derived as follows. The specific energy (energy per unit mass) of any space vehicle is composed of two components, the specific potential energy and the specific kinetic energy. The specific potential energy associated with a planet of mass M is given by
$$\epsilon_p = - \frac{G M}{r},$$
where G is the gravitational constant and r is the distance between the two bodies. The specific kinetic energy of an object is given by
$$\epsilon_k = \frac{v^2}{2},$$
where v is its velocity. So the total specific orbital energy is
$$\epsilon = \epsilon_k + \epsilon_p = \frac{v^2}{2} - \frac{G M}{r}.$$

Since energy is conserved, $\epsilon$ cannot depend on the distance, $r$, from the center of the central body to the space vehicle in question, i.e. v must vary with r to keep the specific orbital energy constant. Therefore, the object can reach infinite $r$ only if this quantity is nonnegative, which implies
$$v \geq \sqrt{\frac{2 G M}{r}}.$$

The escape velocity from the Earth's surface is about 11 km/s, but that is insufficient to send the body an infinite distance because of the gravitational pull of the Sun. To escape the Solar System from a location at a distance from the Sun equal to the distance Sun–Earth, but not close to the Earth, requires around 42 km/s velocity, but there will be "partial credit" for the Earth's orbital velocity for spacecraft launched from Earth, if their further acceleration (due to the propulsion system) carries them in the same direction as Earth travels in its orbit.

=== Formulae for free orbits ===
Orbits are conic sections, so the formula for the distance of a body for a given angle corresponds to the formula for that curve in polar coordinates, which is
$$\begin{align}
r &= \frac{p}{1 + e \cos\theta}, \\
\mu &= G(m_1 + m_2), \\
p &= h^2/\mu,
\end{align}$$
where $\mu$ is called the gravitational parameter, $m_1$ and $m_2$ are the masses of objects 1 and 2, and $h$ is the specific angular momentum of object 2 with respect to object 1. The parameter $\theta$ is known as the true anomaly, $p$ is the semi-latus rectum, while $e$ is the orbital eccentricity, all obtainable from the various forms of the six independent orbital elements.

=== Circular orbits ===
All bounded orbits where the gravity of a central body dominates are elliptical in nature. A special case of this is the circular orbit, which is an ellipse of zero eccentricity. The formula for the velocity of a body in a circular orbit at distance r from the center of gravity of mass M can be derived as follows:

Centrifugal acceleration matches the acceleration due to gravity. So,
$$\frac{v^2}{r} = \frac{GM}{r^2}.$$
Therefore,
$$v = \sqrt{\frac{GM}{r}},$$
where G = 6.6743×10^{−11} m^{3}/(kg·s^{2}) is the gravitational constant.

To properly use this formula, the units must be consistent; for example, $M$ must be in kilograms, and $r$ must be in meters, then the answer will be in meters per second.

The quantity $GM$ is often termed the standard gravitational parameter, which has a different value for every planet or moon in the Solar System.

Once the circular orbital velocity is known, the escape velocity is easily found by multiplying by $\sqrt{2}$:
$$v = \sqrt 2\sqrt{\frac{GM}{r}} = \sqrt{\frac{2GM}{r}}.$$

To escape from gravity, the kinetic energy must at least match the negative potential energy. Therefore,
$$\begin{align}
&\frac{1}{2} mv^2 = \frac{GMm}{r}, \\
&v = \sqrt{\frac{2GM}{r}}.
\end{align}$$

=== Elliptical orbits ===
If $0 < e < 1$, then the denominator of the equation of free orbits varies with the true anomaly $\theta$, but remains positive, never becoming zero. Therefore, the relative position vector remains bounded, having its smallest magnitude at periapsis $r_p$, which is given by
$$r_p = \frac{p}{1 + e}.$$

The maximum value $r$ is reached when $\theta = 180^\circ$. This point is called the apoapsis, and its radial coordinate, denoted $r_a$, is
$$r_a = \frac{p}{1 - e}.$$

Let $2a$ be the distance measured along the apse line from periapsis $P$ to apoapsis $A$:
$$2a = r_p + r_a.$$
Substituting the equations above, we get
$$a = \frac{p}{1 - e^2},$$
where a is the semimajor axis of the ellipse. Solving for $p$ and substituting the result in the conic section curve formula above, we get
$$r = \frac{a(1 - e^2)}{1 + e\cos\theta}.$$

==== Orbital period ====
Under standard assumptions the orbital period ($T$) of a body traveling along an elliptic orbit can be computed as
$$T = 2\pi\sqrt{\frac{a^3}{\mu}},$$
where $\mu$ is the standard gravitational parameter, and $a$ is the length of the semi-major axis. Conclusions:

- The orbital period is equal to that for a circular orbit with the orbit radius equal to the semi-major axis ($a$).
- For a given semi-major axis the orbital period does not depend on the eccentricity (see also Kepler's third law).

==== Velocity ====
Under standard assumptions the orbital speed ($v$) of a body traveling along an elliptic orbit can be computed from the vis-viva equation as
$$v = \sqrt{\mu\left(\frac{2}{r} - \frac{1}{a}\right)},$$
where $\mu$ is the standard gravitational parameter, $r$ is the distance between the orbiting bodies, $a$ is the length of the semi-major axis.

The velocity equation for a hyperbolic trajectory is
$$v = \sqrt{\mu\left(\frac{2}{r} + \frac{1}{|a|}\right)}.$$

==== Energy ====
Under standard assumptions, specific orbital energy ($\epsilon$) of elliptic orbit is negative, and the orbital energy conservation equation (the vis-viva equation) for this orbit can take the form
$$\frac{v^2}{2} - \frac{\mu}{r} = -\frac{\mu}{2a} = \epsilon < 0,$$
where $v$ is the speed of the orbiting body, $r$ is the distance of the orbiting body from the center of mass of the central body, $a$ is the semi-major axis, $\mu$ is the standard gravitational parameter. Conclusions:

- For a given semi-major axis the specific orbital energy is independent of the eccentricity.

Using the virial theorem we find:

- the time-average of the specific potential energy is equal to $2\epsilon$,
- the time-average of $r^{-1}$ is $a^{-1}$,
- the time-average of the specific kinetic energy is equal to $-\epsilon$.

=== Parabolic orbits ===
If the eccentricity equals 1, then the orbit equation becomes
$$r = \frac{h^2}{\mu} \frac{1}{1 + \cos\theta},$$
where $r$ is the radial distance of the orbiting body from the mass center of the central body, $h$ is specific angular momentum of the orbiting body, $\theta$ is the true anomaly of the orbiting body, $\mu$ is the standard gravitational parameter.

As the true anomaly θ approaches 180°, the denominator approaches zero, so that r tends towards infinity. Hence, the energy of the trajectory for which e = 1 is zero, and is given by
$$\epsilon = \frac{v^2}{2} - \frac{\mu}{r} = 0,$$
where $v$ is the speed of the orbiting body.

In other words, the speed anywhere on a parabolic path is
$$v = \sqrt{\frac{2\mu}{r}}.$$

=== Hyperbolic orbits ===
If $e > 1$, the orbit formula
$$r = \frac{h^2}{\mu} \frac{1}{1 + e\cos\theta}$$
describes the geometry of the hyperbolic orbit. The system consists of two symmetric curves. The orbiting body occupies one of them; the other one is its empty mathematical image. Clearly, the denominator of the equation above goes to zero when $\cos\theta = -1/e$. We denote this value of true anomaly
$$\theta_\infty = \cos^{-1}\left(-\frac{1}{e}\right),$$
since the radial distance approaches infinity as the true anomaly approaches $\theta_\infty$, known as the true anomaly of the asymptote. Observe that $\theta_\infty$ lies between 90° and 180°. From the trigonometric identity $\sin^2\theta + \cos^2\theta = 1$ it follows that
$$\sin\theta_\infty = \frac1e \sqrt{e^2 - 1}.$$

==== Energy ====
Under standard assumptions, specific orbital energy ($\epsilon$) of a hyperbolic trajectory is greater than zero, and the orbital energy conservation equation for this kind of trajectory takes form
$$\epsilon = \frac{v^2}{2} - \frac{\mu}{r} = \frac{\mu}{-2a},$$
where $v$ is the orbital velocity of orbiting body, $r$ is the radial distance of orbiting body from central body, $a$ is the negative semi-major axis of the orbit's hyperbola, $\mu$ is standard gravitational parameter.

==== Hyperbolic excess velocity ====
Under standard assumptions the body traveling along a hyperbolic trajectory will attain at $r = \infty$ an orbital velocity called hyperbolic excess velocity ($v_\infty$) that can be computed as
$$v_\infty = \sqrt{\frac{\mu}{-a}},$$
where $\mu$ is standard gravitational parameter, $a$ is the negative semi-major axis of orbit's hyperbola.

The hyperbolic excess velocity is related to the specific orbital energy or characteristic energy by
$$2\epsilon = C_3 = v_\infty^2.$$

== Calculating trajectories ==
=== Kepler's equation ===
One approach to calculating orbits (mainly used historically) is to use Kepler's equation:
$$M = E - \epsilon \sin E,$$
where M is the mean anomaly, E is the eccentric anomaly, and $\epsilon$ is the eccentricity.

With Kepler's formula, finding the time of flight to reach an angle (true anomaly) of $\theta$ from periapsis is broken into two steps:

1. Compute the eccentric anomaly $E$ from true anomaly $\theta$.
2. Compute the time of flight $t$ from the eccentric anomaly $E$.

Finding the eccentric anomaly at a given time (the inverse problem) is more difficult. Kepler's equation is transcendental in $E$, meaning that it cannot be solved for $E$ algebraically. Kepler's equation can be solved for $E$ analytically by inversion.

A solution of Kepler's equation, valid for all real values of $\epsilon$ is
$$E = \begin{cases}
\displaystyle \sum_{n=1}^\infty
\frac{M^{\frac{n}{3}}}{n!} \lim_{\theta \to 0} \left(
\frac{\mathrm{d}^{n-1}}{\mathrm{d}\theta^{n-1}} \left[ \left(
\frac{\theta}{\sqrt[3]{\theta - \sin\theta}} \right)^n \right]
\right), & \epsilon = 1, \\
\displaystyle \sum_{n=1}^{\infty}
\frac{M^n}{n!} \lim_{\theta \to 0} \left(
\frac{\mathrm{d}^{n-1}}{\mathrm{d}\theta^{n-1}} \left[ \left(
\frac{\theta}{\theta - \epsilon \sin\theta} \right)^n \right]
\right), & \epsilon \ne 1.
\end{cases}$$

Evaluating this yields
$$E = \begin{cases}
\displaystyle x + \frac{1}{60} x^3 + \frac{1}{1400}x^5 + \frac{1}{25200}x^7 + \frac{43}{17248000}x^9 + \frac{ 1213}{7207200000 }x^{11} +
\frac{151439}{12713500800000 }x^{13} \cdots \mid x = (6M)^\frac{1}{3}, & \epsilon = 1 \\[1ex]
\displaystyle \frac{1}{1 - \epsilon} M
- \frac{\epsilon}{( 1-\epsilon)^4 } \frac{M^3}{3!}
+ \frac{(9 \epsilon^2 + \epsilon)}{(1-\epsilon)^7 } \frac{M^5}{5!}
- \frac{(225 \epsilon^3 + 54 \epsilon^2 + \epsilon ) }{(1-\epsilon)^{10} } \frac{M^7}{7!}
+ \frac{ (11025\epsilon^4 + 4131 \epsilon^3 + 243 \epsilon^2 + \epsilon ) }{(1 - \epsilon)^{13}} \frac{M^9}{9!} \cdots, & \epsilon \ne 1.
\end{cases}$$

Alternatively, Kepler's equation can be solved numerically. First, one must guess a value of $E$ and solve for time of flight; then adjust $E$ as necessary to bring the computed time of flight closer to the desired value until the required precision is achieved. Usually, Newton's method is used to achieve relatively fast convergence.

The main difficulty with this approach is that it can take prohibitively long to converge for the extreme elliptical orbits. For near-parabolic orbits, eccentricity $\epsilon$ is nearly 1, and substituting $e = 1$ into the formula for mean anomaly, $E - \sin E$, we find ourselves subtracting two nearly equal values, and accuracy suffers. For near-circular orbits, it is hard to find the periapsis in the first place (and truly circular orbits have no periapsis at all). Furthermore, the equation was derived on the assumption of an elliptical orbit, and so it does not hold for parabolic or hyperbolic orbits. These difficulties are what led to the development of the universal variable formulation, described below.

=== Conic orbits ===
For simple procedures, such as computing the delta-v for coplanar transfer ellipses, traditional approaches are fairly effective. Others, such as time-of-flight are far more complicated, especially for near-circular and hyperbolic orbits.

=== The patched conic approximation ===
The Hohmann transfer orbit alone is a poor approximation for interplanetary trajectories because it neglects the planets' own gravity. Planetary gravity dominates the behavior of the spacecraft in the vicinity of a planet and in most cases Hohmann severely overestimates delta-v, and produces highly inaccurate prescriptions for burn timings. A relatively simple way to get a first-order approximation of delta-v is based on the "patched conic approximation" technique. One must choose the one dominant gravitating body in each region of space through which the trajectory will pass, and to model only that body's effects in that region. For instance, on a trajectory from the Earth to Mars, one would begin by considering only the Earth's gravity until the trajectory reaches a distance where the Earth's gravity no longer dominates that of the Sun. The spacecraft would be given escape velocity to send it on its way to interplanetary space. Next, one would consider only the Sun's gravity until the trajectory reaches the neighborhood of Mars. During this stage, the transfer orbit model is appropriate. Finally, only Mars's gravity is considered during the final portion of the trajectory where Mars's gravity dominates the spacecraft's behavior. The spacecraft would approach Mars on a hyperbolic orbit, and a final retrograde burn would slow the spacecraft enough to be captured by Mars. Friedrich Zander was one of the first to apply the patched-conics approach for astrodynamics purposes, when proposing the use of intermediary bodies' gravity for interplanetary travels, in what is known today as a gravity assist.

The size of the "neighborhoods" (or spheres of influence) vary with radius
$$r_\text{SOI} = a_\text{p}\left(\frac{m_\text{p}}{m_\text{S}}\right)^{2/5}.$$
where $a_\text{p}$ is the semimajor axis of the planet's orbit relative to the Sun; $m_\text{p}$ and $m_\text{S}$ are the masses of the planet and Sun, respectively.

This simplification is sufficient to compute rough estimates of fuel requirements, and rough time-of-flight estimates, but it is not generally accurate enough to guide a spacecraft to its destination. For that, numerical methods are required.

=== The universal variable formulation ===
To address the computational shortcomings of traditional approaches for solving the 2-body problem, the universal variable formulation was developed. It works equally well for the circular, elliptical, parabolic, and hyperbolic cases, the differential equations converging well when integrated for any orbit. It also generalizes well to problems incorporating perturbation theory.

=== Perturbations ===
The universal variable formulation works well with the variation of parameters technique, except now, instead of the six Keplerian orbital elements, we use a different set of orbital elements: namely, the satellite's initial position and velocity vectors $x_0$ and $v_0$ at a given epoch $t = 0$. In a two-body simulation, these elements are sufficient to compute the satellite's position and velocity at any time in the future, using the universal variable formulation. Conversely, at any moment in the satellite's orbit, we can measure its position and velocity, and then use the universal variable approach to determine what its initial position and velocity would have been at the epoch. In perfect two-body motion, these orbital elements would be invariant (just like the Keplerian elements would be).

However, perturbations cause the orbital elements to change over time. Hence, the position element is written as $x_0(t)$ and the velocity element as $v_0(t)$, indicating that they vary with time. The technique to compute the effect of perturbations becomes one of finding expressions, either exact or approximate, for the functions $x_0(t)$ and $v_0(t)$.

The following are some effects which make real orbits differ from the simple models based on a spherical Earth. Most of them can be handled on short timescales (perhaps less than a few thousand orbits) by perturbation theory because they are small relative to the corresponding two-body effects.

- Equatorial bulges cause precession of the node and the perigee
- Tesseral harmonics of the gravity field introduce additional perturbations
- Lunar and solar gravity perturbations alter the orbits
- Atmospheric drag reduces the semi-major axis unless make-up thrust is used

Over very long timescales (perhaps millions of orbits), even small perturbations can dominate, and the behavior can become chaotic. On the other hand, the various perturbations can be orchestrated by clever astrodynamicists to assist with orbit maintenance tasks, such as station-keeping, ground track maintenance or adjustment, or phasing of perigee to cover selected targets at low altitude.

== Orbital maneuver ==
In spaceflight, an orbital maneuver is the use of propulsion systems to change the orbit of a spacecraft. For spacecraft far from Earth—for example those in orbits around the Sun—an orbital maneuver is called a deep-space maneuver (DSM).

=== Orbital transfer ===
Transfer orbits are usually elliptical orbits that allow spacecraft to move from one (usually substantially circular) orbit to another. Usually, they require a burn at the start, a burn at the end, and sometimes one or more burns in the middle.

- The Hohmann transfer orbit requires a minimal delta-v.
- A bi-elliptic transfer can require less energy than the Hohmann transfer, if the ratio of orbits is 11.94 or greater, but comes at the cost of increased trip time over the Hohmann transfer.
- Faster transfers may use any orbit that intersects both the original and destination orbits, at the cost of higher delta-v.
- Using low thrust engines (such as electrical propulsion), if the initial orbit is supersynchronous to the final desired circular orbit then the optimal transfer orbit is achieved by thrusting continuously in the direction of the velocity at apogee. This method however takes much longer due to the low thrust.

For the case of orbital transfer between non-coplanar orbits, the change-of-plane thrust must be made at the point where the orbital planes intersect (the "node"). As the objective is to change the direction of the velocity vector by an angle equal to the angle between the planes, almost all of this thrust should be made when the spacecraft is at the node near the apoapse, when the magnitude of the velocity vector is at its lowest. However, a small fraction of the orbital inclination change can be made at the node near the periapse, by slightly angling the transfer orbit injection thrust in the direction of the desired inclination change. This works because the cosine of a small angle is very nearly one, resulting in the small plane change being effectively "free" despite the high velocity of the spacecraft near periapse, as the Oberth Effect due to the increased, slightly angled thrust exceeds the cost of the thrust in the orbit-normal axis.

A Hohmann transfer from a low circular orbit to a higher circular orbit

A bi-elliptic transfer from a low circular starting orbit (dark blue), to a higher circular orbit (red)

Generic two-impulse elliptical transfer between two circular orbits

A general transfer from a low circular orbit to a higher circular orbit

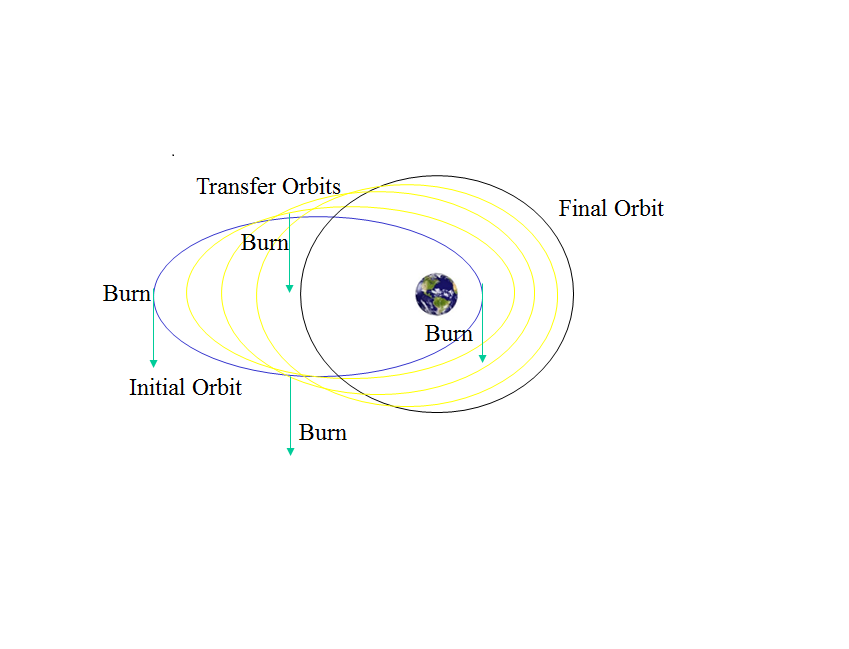
An optimal sequence for transferring a satellite from a supersynchronous to a geosynchronous orbit using electric propulsion

=== Gravity assist and the Oberth effect ===
In a gravity assist, a spacecraft swings by a planet and leaves in a different direction, at a different speed. This is useful to speed or slow a spacecraft instead of carrying more fuel.

This maneuver can be approximated by an elastic collision at large distances, though the flyby does not involve any physical contact. Due to Newton's third law (equal and opposite reaction), any momentum gained by a spacecraft must be lost by the planet, or vice versa. However, because the planet is much, much more massive than the spacecraft, the effect on the planet's orbit is negligible.

The Oberth effect can be employed, particularly during a gravity assist operation. This effect is that use of a propulsion system works better at high speeds, and hence course changes are best done when close to a gravitating body; this can multiply the effective delta-v.

=== Interplanetary Transport Network and fuzzy orbits ===
Orbital routes can be identified using nonlinear gravitational interactions between planets and moons in the Solar System. These trajectories are part of the Interplanetary Transport Network and follow chaotic orbital paths that require minimal fuel beyond reaching a Lagrange point, with periodic course corrections. Orbits can be plotted from high Earth orbit to Mars via an Earth trojan points. Limitations include long transit times, often taking several years, and infrequent launch windows.

They have, however, been employed on projects such as Genesis. This spacecraft visited the Earth-Sun L_{1} point and returned using very little propellant.

== See also ==
- Celestial mechanics
- Chaos theory
- Kepler orbit
- Lagrange point
- Mechanical engineering
- N-body problem
- Roche limit
- Spacecraft propulsion
- Universal variable formulation
