= Oberth effect =

Type of spacecraft maneuver

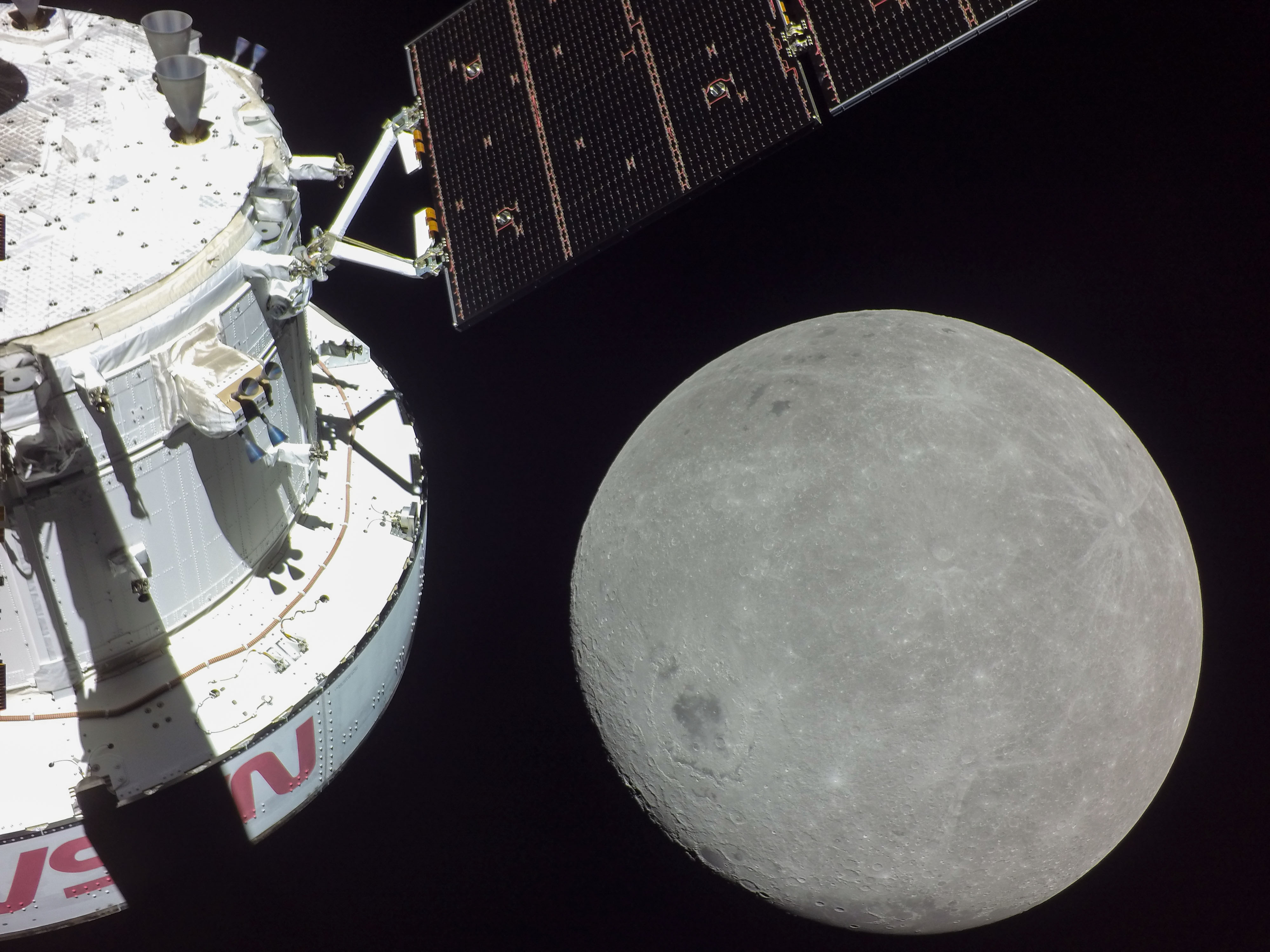
Orion approaching the Moon for a powered flyby during NASA's Artemis I mission

In astronautics, a powered flyby, or Oberth maneuver, is a maneuver in which a spacecraft falls into a gravity well and then uses its engines to further accelerate, thereby achieving additional change in speed. The resulting maneuver is a more efficient way to gain or lose kinetic energy than applying the same impulse outside of a gravity well. The gain in efficiency is explained by the Oberth effect, wherein the use of a reaction engine at higher speeds (relative to any reference frame) generates a greater change in mechanical energy than its use at lower speeds. In practical terms, this means that the most energy-efficient method for a spacecraft to burn its fuel is at the lowest possible orbital periapsis, when its orbital velocity (and so, its kinetic energy) is greatest. In some cases, it is even worth spending fuel on slowing the spacecraft into a gravity well to take advantage of the efficiencies of the Oberth effect. The maneuver and effect are named after Hermann Oberth, an Austro-Hungarian-born German physicist and a founder of modern rocketry, who first described them in 1927.

Because the vehicle remains near periapsis only for a short time, for the Oberth maneuver to be most effective the vehicle must be able to generate as much impulse as possible in the shortest possible time. As a result the Oberth maneuver is much more useful for high-thrust rocket engines such as liquid-propellant rockets, and less useful for low-thrust reaction engines such as ion drives, which take a long time to gain speed. Low-thrust rockets can use the Oberth effect by splitting a long departure burn into several short burns over multiple orbits. The Oberth effect also can be used to understand the behavior of multi-stage rockets: the upper stage can generate much more usable kinetic energy than the total chemical energy of the propellant it carries.

In terms of the energies involved, the Oberth effect is more effective at higher speeds because at high speed the propellant has significant kinetic energy due to its mass in addition to its chemical potential energy. At higher speed the vehicle is able to employ the greater change (reduction or gain) in kinetic energy of the propellant (if it is exhausted backward it is at reduced speed and hence reduced kinetic energy) to generate a greater change in kinetic energy of the vehicle.

== Explanation in terms of work and kinetic energy ==
Because the kinetic energy of a mass varies in proportion to the square of change in its velocity ($E_\text{k} = \frac{1}{2}mv^2$), an increase in velocity imparts a greater increase in kinetic energy at a high velocity than it would at a low velocity. For example, considering a rocket with a mass of 2 kg:

- the rocket travelling at 1 metre per second has ½·2·1^{2} = 1 joule of kinetic energy; increasing its velocity by 1 m/s increases the kinetic energy to ½·2·2^{2} = 4 J, a gain of 3 J;
- at a velocity of 10 m/s, the rocket has ½·2·10^{2} = 100 J of kinetic energy; increasing its velocity by 1 m/s increases the kinetic energy to ½·2·11^{2} = 121 J, a gain of 21 J.
- at a velocity of 100 m/s, the rocket has ½·2·100^{2} = 10,000 J of kinetic energy; increasing its velocity by 1 m/s increases the kinetic energy to ½·2·101^{2} = 10,201 J, a gain of 201 J.

This greater change in kinetic energy can then carry the rocket higher in the gravity well than if the propellant was burned at a lower speed.

== Description in terms of work ==
The thrust produced by a rocket engine is independent of the rocket’s velocity relative to the surrounding atmosphere. A rocket acting on a fixed object, as in a static firing, does no useful work; the rocket's chemical energy is progressively converted to kinetic energy of the exhaust, plus heat. But when the rocket moves, its thrust acts through the distance it moves. Force multiplied by displacement is the definition of mechanical work. The greater the velocity of the rocket and payload during the burn, the greater the displacement and the work done, and the greater the increase in kinetic energy of the rocket and its payload. As the velocity of the rocket increases, progressively more of the available kinetic energy goes to the rocket and its payload, and less to the exhaust.

This is shown as follows. The mechanical work done on the rocket ($W$) is defined as the dot product of the force of the engine's thrust ($\vec{F}$) and the displacement it travels during the burn ($\vec{s}$):

$$W = \vec{F} \cdot \vec{s}.$$

If the burn is made in the prograde direction, $\vec{F} \cdot \vec{s} = \|F\| \cdot \|s\| = F \cdot s$. The work results in a change in kinetic energy

$$\Delta E_k = F \cdot s.$$

Differentiating with respect to time, we obtain

$$\frac{\mathrm{d}E_k}{\mathrm{d}t} = F \cdot \frac{\mathrm{d}s}{\mathrm{d}t},$$

or

$$\frac{\mathrm{d}E_k}{\mathrm{d}t} = F \cdot v,$$

where $v$ is the velocity. Dividing by the instantaneous mass $m$ to express this in terms of specific energy ($e_k$), we get

$$\frac{\mathrm{d}e_k}{\mathrm{d}t} = \frac F m \cdot v = a \cdot v,$$

where $a$ is the acceleration vector.

From this, it can be seen that the rate of change of specific energy of every part of the rocket is proportional to its speed and, given this, the equation can be integrated (numerically or otherwise) to calculate the overall change in the specific energy of the rocket.

== Impulsive burn ==
Integrating the above energy equation is often unnecessary if the burn duration is short. Short burns of chemical rocket engines close to periapsis or elsewhere are usually mathematically modeled as impulsive burns, where the force of the engine dominates any other forces that might change the vehicle's energy over the burn.

For example, as a vehicle falls toward periapsis in any orbit (closed or escape orbits) the velocity relative to the central body increases. Briefly burning the engine (an "impulsive burn") prograde at periapsis increases the velocity by the same increment as at any other time ($\Delta v$). However, since the vehicle's kinetic energy is related to the square of its velocity, this increase in velocity has a non-linear effect on the vehicle's kinetic energy, leaving it with higher energy than if the burn was conducted at any other time.

=== Oberth calculation for a parabolic orbit ===
If an impulsive burn of Δv is performed at periapsis in a parabolic orbit, then the velocity at periapsis before the burn is equal to the escape velocity (V_{esc}), and the specific kinetic energy after the burn is

$$\begin{align}
e_k &= \tfrac{1}{2} V^2 \\
&= \tfrac{1}{2} (V_\text{esc} + \Delta v )^2 \\
&= \tfrac{1}{2} V_\text{esc} ^ 2 + \Delta v V_\text{esc} + \tfrac{1}{2} \Delta v^2,
\end{align}$$

where $V = V_\text{esc} + \Delta v$.

When the vehicle leaves the gravity field, the loss of specific kinetic energy is

$$\tfrac{1}{2} V_\text{esc}^2,$$

so it retains the energy

$$\Delta v V_\text{esc} + \tfrac{1}{2} \Delta v^2,$$

which is larger than the energy from a burn outside the gravitational field ($\tfrac{1}{2} \Delta v^2$) by

$$\Delta v V_\text{esc}.$$

When the vehicle has left the gravity well, it is traveling at a speed

$$V = \Delta v \sqrt{1 + \frac{2 V_\text{esc}}{\Delta v}}.$$

For the case where the added impulse Δv is small compared to escape velocity, the 1 can be ignored, and the effective Δv of the impulsive burn can be seen to be multiplied by a factor of simply

$$\sqrt{\frac{2 V_\text{esc}}{\Delta v}}$$

and one gets

$V$ ≈ $\sqrt{{2 V_\text{esc}}{\Delta v}} .$

Similar effects happen in closed and hyperbolic orbits.

=== Parabolic example ===
If the vehicle travels at velocity v at the start of a burn that changes the velocity by Δv, then the change in specific orbital energy (SOE) due to the new orbit is

$$v \,\Delta v + \tfrac{1}{2}(\Delta v)^2.$$

Once the spacecraft is far from the planet again, the SOE is entirely kinetic, since gravitational potential energy approaches zero. Therefore, the larger the v at the time of the burn, the greater the final kinetic energy, and the higher the final velocity.

The effect becomes more pronounced the closer to the central body, or more generally, the deeper in the gravitational field potential in which the burn occurs, since the velocity is higher there.

So if a spacecraft is on a parabolic flyby of Jupiter with a periapsis velocity of 50 km/s and performs a 5 km/s burn, it turns out that the final velocity change at great distance is 22.9 km/s, giving a multiplication of the burn by 4.58 times.

== Paradox ==
It may seem that the rocket is getting energy for free, which would violate the law of conservation of energy. However, any gain to the rocket's kinetic energy is balanced by a relative decrease in the kinetic energy the exhaust is left with (the kinetic energy of the exhaust may still increase, but it does not increase as much). Contrast this to the situation of static firing, where the speed of the engine is fixed at zero. This means that its kinetic energy does not increase at all, and all the chemical energy released by the fuel is converted to the exhaust's kinetic energy (and heat).

At very high speeds the mechanical energy imparted to the rocket can exceed the total energy liberated in the combustion of the propellant; this may also seem to violate the law of conservation of energy. But the propellants in a fast-moving rocket carry energy not only chemically, but also in their own kinetic energy, which at speeds above a few kilometres per second exceeds the chemical component. (If the theoretical 2 kg rocket mentioned above is travelling at twenty kilometres per second in space and increases its velocity by just one metre per second, its kinetic energy increases by forty thousand joules.) When these propellants are burned, some of this kinetic energy is transferred to the rocket along with the chemical energy released by burning.

The Oberth effect can therefore partly make up for what is extremely low efficiency early in the rocket's flight when it is moving only slowly. Most of the work done by a rocket early in flight is "invested" in the kinetic energy of the propellants not yet burned, part of which they will release later when they are burned.

== See also ==
- Bi-elliptic transfer
- Gravity assist
- Propulsive efficiency
