= Outline of space exploration =

Overview of and topical guide to space exploration

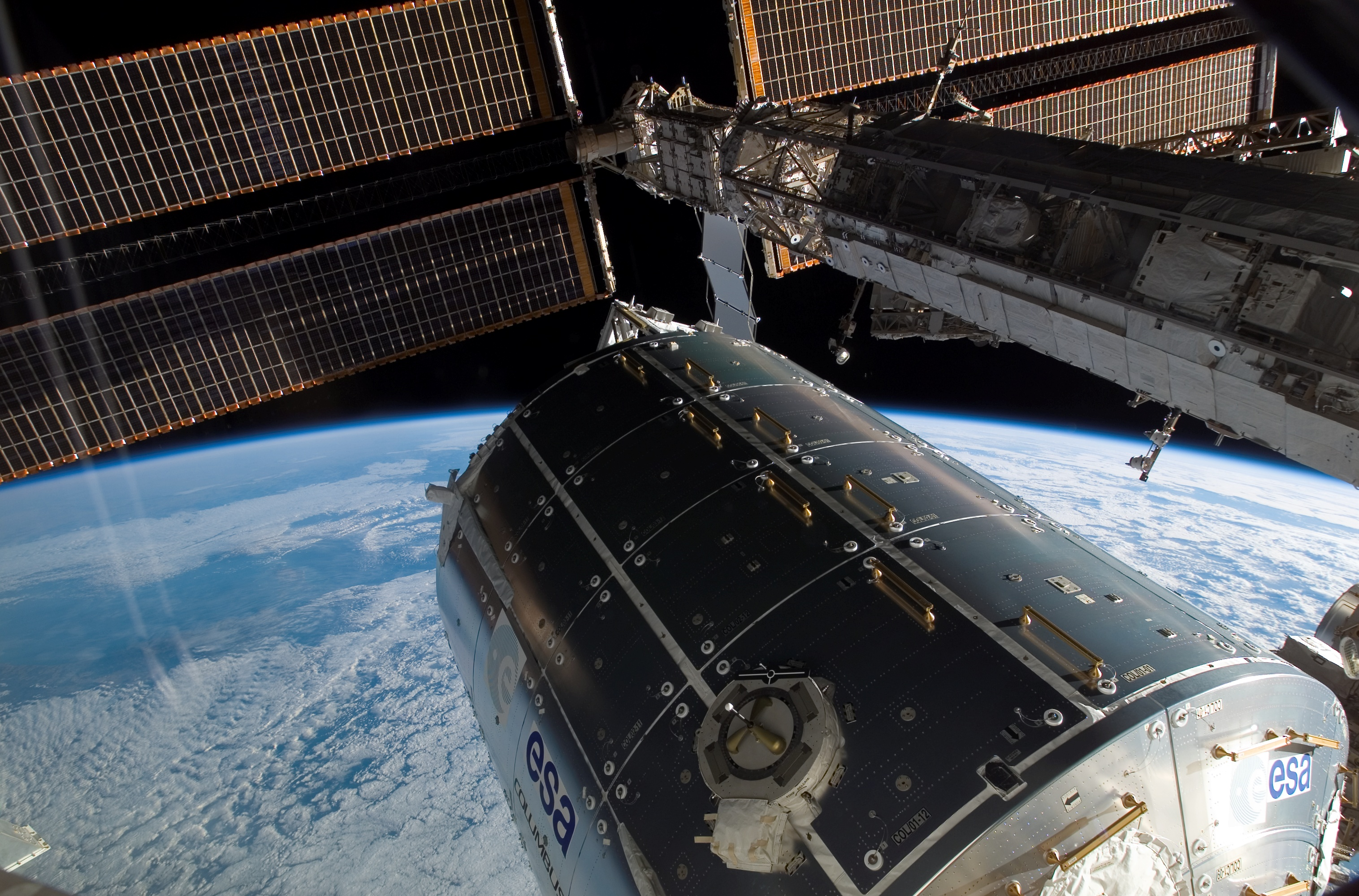
Columbus Module at the International Space Station, launched into space on the U.S. Space Shuttle mission STS-122 in 2008.

The following outline is provided as an overview of and topical guide to space exploration.

Space exploration – use of astronomy and space technology to explore outer space. Physical exploration of space is conducted both by human spaceflights and by robotic spacecraft.

== Essence of space exploration ==
Space exploration

- Big science – Term used to describe a series of changes in science which occurred in industrial nations
- Exploration – Investigating an unfamiliar area
- High tech – Most advanced technology available
- Space – Void between celestial bodies
- Spaceflight – Flight into or through outer space

== Branches of space exploration ==
- Human spaceflight – Spaceflight with a crew or passengers
- Uncrewed spaceflight – Autonomous space travel without human

== History of space exploration ==
- Remote sensing of Earth
- Exploration of the Moon
  - Apollo program
  - Moon landings
  - Robotic exploration of the Moon
- Exploration of Mercury
- Exploration of Venus
- Exploration of Mars
  - Mars landings
  - Mars rovers
  - Mars Rotorcrafts
  - Mars flyby
- Exploration of Jupiter
- Exploration of Saturn
- Exploration of Uranus
- Exploration of Neptune
- History of human spaceflight
  - Project Mercury
  - Project Gemini
  - Apollo program
  - Space Shuttle program
  - Vostok program
  - Voskhod program
  - Soyuz program
  - Shenzhou program
- List of human spaceflights
- List of Space Shuttle missions
- Spaceflight records
- Emergence of market forces in spaceflight
- Timeline of artificial satellites and space probes
- Timeline of astronauts by nationality
- Timeline of first orbital launches by country
- Timeline of rocket and missile technology
- Timeline of space exploration
- Timeline of space travel by nationality
- Timeline of spaceflight
- Timeline of the Space Race
- Timeline of Solar System exploration

== Space agencies ==
- List of government space agencies
  - Space agencies capable of human spaceflight (as of January 2024)
    - NASA (USA)
    - CNSA (China)
    - RFSA (Russia)
  - Space agencies with full launch capability
    - NASA (USA)
    - RFSA (Russia)
    - CNSA (China)
    - ISRO (India)
    - ESA (Europe)
    - JAXA (Japan)
    - ISA (Israel)
    - KARI (South Korea)

== Active deep space missions and space stations ==
- International Space Station
- Space Weather Follow On-Lagrange 1 (NOAA)
- Carruthers Geocorona Observatory (NASA)
- Interstellar Mapping and Acceleration Probe (NASA)
- Europa Clipper (NASA)
- Tiangong space station (CNSA)
- Chandrayaan-2 (ISRO)
- Tianwen-2 (CNSA)
- Hera (ESA)
- Tiandu-1 and 2 (CNSA)
- Queqiao relay satellite (CNSA)
- Queqiao-2 relay satellite (CNSA)
- ICUBE-Q (SUPARCO)
- Chang'e 5 service module (CNSA)
- DRO A/B (CAS)
- Chang'e 4 (CNSA)
- CAPSTONE (NASA)
- Danuri (KARI)
- Advanced Composition Explorer – NASA mission to observe solar wind
- Deep Space Climate Observatory – NOAA observatory for space weather
- Aditya-L1 (ISRO)
- Mars Odyssey (NASA)
- Mars Express – ESA satellite orbiting Mars
- Mars Reconnaissance Orbiter (NASA)
- Mars Science Laboratory – NASA rover to Mars
- MAVEN – NASA satellite orbiting Mars
- ExoMars Trace Gas Orbiter (ESA / Roscosmos) – Mars satellite
- Tianwen-1 (CNSA)
- Mars 2020 Perseverance rover – NASA rover to Mars
- BepiColombo (ESA / JAXA)
- STEREO – NASA mission to observe the Sun
- Parker Solar Probe – NASA probe to Sun
- Solar Orbiter – ESA probe to Sun
- Hayabusa2♯ (JAXA) – sample return mission to asteroid Ryugu
- OSIRIS-APEX (NASA) – probe to asteroid Apophis
- Lucy – NASA probe to multiple Jupiter trojans
- Psyche (NASA) – probe to asteroid Psyche
- Juno – NASA satellite orbiting Jupiter
- Jupiter Icy Moons Explorer – ESA probe to Jupiter and its moons
- New Horizons – probe to Pluto
- Voyager 1 and Voyager 2 (NASA) – probes to outer Solar System and interstellar space

== Future of space exploration ==
Lunar (the Moon)

- Future lunar missions
- Colonization of the Moon
- Lunar outpost (NASA)

Mercury

- Colonization of Mercury

Venus

- Exploration of Venus

Mars

- Colonization of Mars
- Human mission to Mars
- Mars to Stay

Outer Solar System

- Colonization of the outer Solar System
  - Colonization of Titan

Beyond the Solar System

- Interstellar travel
  - Nuclear rocket
  - Fusion rocket
  - Solar sail
  - Einstein-Rosen bridge
  - Alcubierre drive
- Intergalactic travel

== General space exploration concepts ==
- Astronaut – Spacecraft crew member
- Non-rocket spacelaunch – Concepts for launch into space
- Space and survival – Idea that spacefaring is necessary for long-term human survival
- Space vehicle – Combination of launch vehicle and spacecraft
  - Launch vehicle – Rocket used to carry a spacecraft into space
  - Spacecraft – Vehicle or machine designed to fly in space
- Spaceflight – Flight into or through outer space
- Space research – Scientific studies carried out using scientific equipment in outer space

== Leaders in space exploration ==
- Yuri Gagarin – first man in space
- Neil Armstrong and Buzz Aldrin – first men to walk on the Moon
- John Glenn – oldest man in orbit

== See also ==
- Outline of space science
- Outline of aerospace
- Timeline of Solar System exploration
- Scientific research on the International Space Station

=== Lists ===
- List of spacecraft
  - List of crewed spacecraft
  - List of Solar System probes
    - List of active Solar System probes
    - List of proposed Solar System probes
    - List of lunar probes
    - List of Mars landers
    - List of Mars orbiters
  - List of space telescopes
    - List of proposed space telescopes
  - List of cargo spacecraft
  - List of Falcon 9 first-stage boosters
  - List of heaviest spacecraft
  - List of spacecraft called Sputnik
  - List of spacecraft powered by non-rechargeable batteries
  - List of spacecraft with electric propulsion
  - List of spaceplanes
  - List of upper stages
  - List of spacecraft deployed from the International Space Station
- Assembly of the International Space Station
- Space Shuttle crews
- List of Apollo astronauts
- List of Apollo missions
- List of Artemis missions
- List of artificial objects on extra-terrestrial surfaces
- List of astronauts by name
- List of astronauts by selection
- List of communication satellite companies
- List of communications satellite firsts
- List of Constellation missions
- List of Cosmos satellites
- List of crewed spacecraft
- List of cumulative spacewalk records
- List of Earth observation satellites
- List of human spaceflight programs
- List of human spaceflights
- List of human spaceflights to the International Space Station
- List of interplanetary voyages
- List of ISS spacewalks
- List of International Space Station expeditions
- List of International Space Station visitors
- List of landings on extraterrestrial bodies
- List of launch vehicles
- List of Mir expeditions
- List of Mir spacewalks
- List of NASA missions
- List of objects at Lagrangian points
- List of private spaceflight companies
- List of probes by operational status
- List of rockets
- Lists of rocket launches
  - List of Ariane launches
  - List of Atlas launches
  - List of Black Brant launches
  - List of Falcon 9 and Falcon Heavy launches
  - List of Long March launches
  - List of Proton launches
  - List of R-7 launches
  - List of Scout launches
  - List of Space Launch System launches
  - List of Thor and Delta launches
  - List of Titan launches
  - List of V-2 test launches
  - List of Zenit launches
- List of Russian human spaceflight missions
- List of satellites in geosynchronous orbit
- List of Solar System probes
- List of Soviet human spaceflight missions
- List of space agencies
- List of Space Shuttle missions
- List of space travelers by name
- List of space travelers by nationality
- List of spacecraft and crews that visited Mir
- List of spacecraft manufacturers
- List of spaceflight records
- List of spaceports
- List of spacewalks and moonwalks
- List of the largest fixed satellite operators
- Uncrewed spaceflights to the International Space Station
- Lists of astronomical objects
- Lists of telescopes
- List of government space agencies
- Lists of astronauts
- Lists of space scientists
