= List of active Solar System probes =

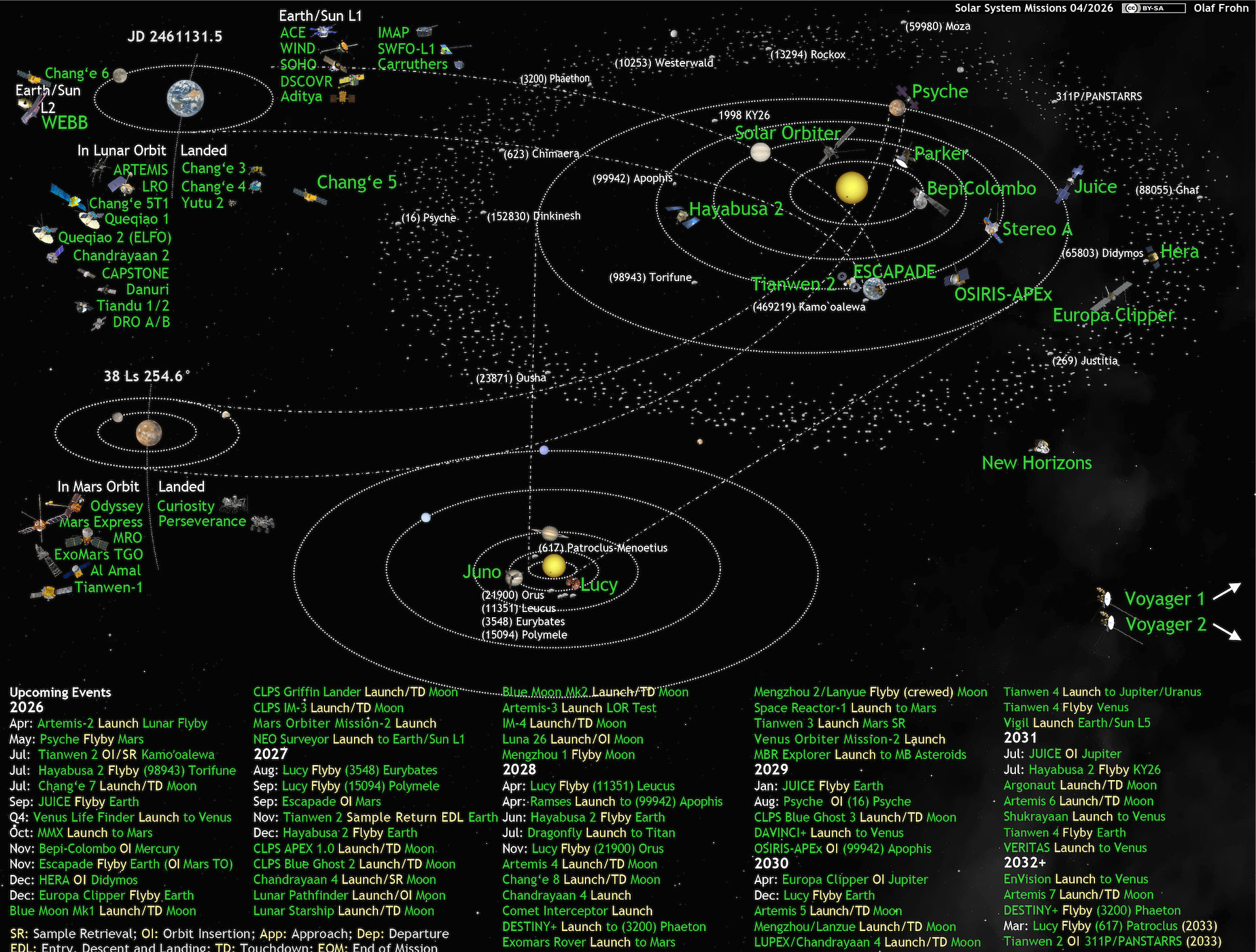
Solar System space probes operational as of 2026

This is a list of active space probes which have escaped Earth orbit. It includes lunar space probes, but does not include space probes orbiting at the Sun–Earth Lagrangian points (for these, see List of objects at Lagrangian points). A craft is deemed "active" if it is still able to transmit usable data to Earth (regardless of whether it can receive commands).

The craft are further grouped by mission status – "en-route", "mission in progress" or "mission complete" – based on their primary mission. For example, though Voyager 1 is still contactable en-route to the Oort Cloud and has exited the Solar System, it is listed as "mission complete" because its primary task of studying Jupiter and Saturn has been accomplished. Once a probe has reached its first primary target, it is no longer listed as "en route" regardless of whether further travel is involved.

== Missions in progress ==
=== Moon ===
- ARTEMIS P1/P2
  - Mission: studying the effect of the solar wind on the Moon. Originally launched as Earth satellites, they were later repurposed and moved to lunar orbit.
  - Launched: February 17, 2007
  - Destination: Moon (in lunar orbit)
  - Arrival: July 2011
  - Institution: (United States) NASA
- Lunar Reconnaissance Orbiter
  - Mission: Orbiter engaged in lunar mapping intended to identify safe landing sites, locate potential resources on the Moon, characterize the radiation environment, and demonstrate new technology.
  - Launched: 18 June 2009
  - Destination: Moon (in lunar orbit)
  - Arrival: 23 June 2009
  - Institution: (United States) NASA
- Queqiao
  - Mission: Halo orbiter serving as communications satellite for Chang'e 4 lunar far-side mission; conducting joint China-Netherlands low frequency astronomy experiment.
  - Launched: 21:28 UT on 20 May 2018
  - Destination: in halo orbit about Earth-Moon L_{2}
  - Arrival: 14 June 2018
  - Institution: (China) CNSA
- Chang'e 4 lander and rover
  - Mission: Lander engaging in low-frequency radio spectrometry experiment, neutron and dosimetry experiment, and biological experiment. Rover seeking to characterize lunar far-side environment (including possible lunar mantle material) using visible/near-infrared spectrometer, ground penetrating radar, cameras, and neutral particle analyzer.
  - Launched: 18:23 UT on 8 December 2018
  - Destination: Lunar far side
  - Arrival: 02:26 UT on 3 January 2019
  - Institution: (China) CNSA
- Chandrayaan-2 Orbiter
  - Mission: engaged in lunar topography and mineralogy, elemental abundance, the lunar exosphere, and signatures of hydroxyl and water.
  - Launched: 22 July 2019
  - Destination: Moon (in lunar orbit)
  - Arrival: 20 August 2019
  - Institution: (India) ISRO
- CAPSTONE
  - Mission: Lunar orbiting CubeSat that will test and verify the calculated orbital stability planned for the Gateway space station.
  - Launched: 28 June 2022
  - Destination: Moon (in a Near-rectilinear halo orbit (NRHO))
  - Arrival: 14 November 2022
  - Institution: (United States) NASA
- Danuri (Korea Pathfinder Lunar Orbiter)
  - Mission: Lunar Orbiter by the Korea Aerospace Research Institute (KARI) of South Korea. The orbiter, its science payload and ground control infrastructure are technology demonstrators. The orbiter will also be tasked with surveying lunar resources such as water ice, uranium, helium-3, silicon, and aluminium, and produce a topographic map to help select future lunar landing sites.
  - Launched: 4 August 2022
  - Destination: Moon (in lunar orbit)
  - Arrival: 16 December 2022
  - Institution: collaboration between (South Korea) KARI and (United States) NASA
- Queqiao-2
  - Mission: lunar orbiter serving as communications satellite for Chang'e 6, Chang'e 7 Chang'e 8 and International Lunar Research Station on lunar far-side mission;
  - Launched: 20 March 2024
  - Destination: Moon (in lunar orbit)
  - Arrival: 24 March 2024
  - Institution: (China) CNSA
- Tiandu-1
  - Mission: Testing technologies for a future lunar Satellite constellation.
  - Launched: 20 March 2024
  - Destination: Moon (in lunar orbit)
  - Arrival: 24 March 2024
  - Institution: (China) Deep Space Exploration Laboratory
- Tiandu-2
  - Mission: Testing technologies for a future lunar Satellite constellation.
  - Launched: 20 March 2024
  - Destination: Moon (in lunar orbit)
  - Arrival: 24 March 2024
  - Institution: (China) Deep Space Exploration Laboratory
- DRO A/B
  - Mission: Testing technologies to establish lunar navigation and communications infrastructure to support lunar exploration.
  - Launched: 13 March 2024
  - Destination: Moon (in DRO)
  - Arrival: ~20 August 2024
  - Institution: China Academy of Sciences

=== Mercury ===
- BepiColombo
  - Mission: Spacecraft consists of the Mercury Transfer Module (MTM), Mercury Planetary Orbiter (MPO), and the Mercury Magnetospheric Orbiter (MMO or Mio). MTM and MPO are built by ESA while the MMO is mostly built by JAXA. Once the MTM delivers the MPO and MMO to Mercury orbit, the two orbiters will have the following objectives: to study Mercury's form, interior structure, geology, composition, and craters; to study the origin, structure, and dynamics of its magnetic field; to characterize the composition and dynamics of Mercury's vestigial atmosphere; to test Einstein's theory of general relativity; to search for asteroids sunward of Earth; and to generally study the origin and evolution of a planet close to a parent star.
  - Launched: 01:45:28 UT on 19 October 2018
  - Destination: Mercury
  - Expected arrival: November 2026 (Mercury polar orbit)
  - Institution: ESA (Japan) JAXA

=== Mars ===
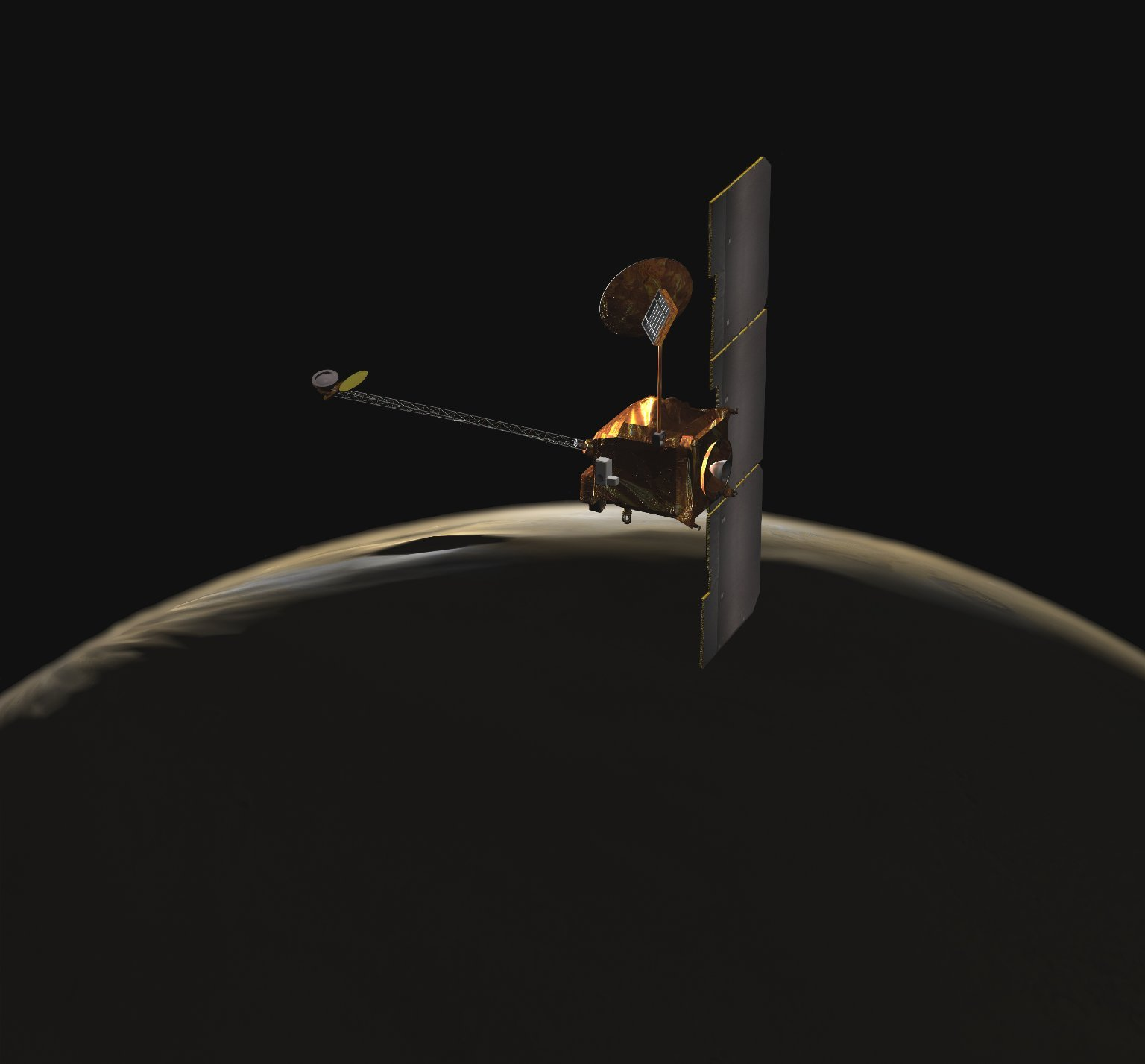
The oldest active spacecraft for Mars is 2001 Mars Odyssey

- 2001 Mars Odyssey
  - Mission: Mars Odyssey was designed to map the surface of Mars and also acts as a relay for the Curiosity rover. Its name is a tribute to the novel and 1968 film 2001: A Space Odyssey.
  - Launched: 7 April 2001
  - Destination: Mars
  - Arrival: 24 October 2001
  - Institution: (United States) NASA
- Mars Express
  - Mission: Mars orbiter designed to study the planet's atmosphere and geology and search for sub-surface water. In 2017 the mission was extended until at least the end of 2020.
  - Launched: 2 June 2003
  - Destination: Mars
  - Arrival: 25 December 2003
  - Institution: ESA
- Mars Reconnaissance Orbiter
  - Mission: the second NASA satellite orbiting Mars. It is specifically designed to analyze the landforms, stratigraphy, minerals, and ice of the red planet.
  - Launched: 12 August 2005
  - Destination: Mars
  - Arrival: 10 March 2006
  - Institution: (United States) NASA
- Curiosity rover
  - Mission: searching for evidence of organic material on Mars, monitoring methane levels in the atmosphere, and engaging in exploration of the landing site at Gale Crater.
  - Launched: 26 November 2011
  - Destination: Mars
  - Arrival: 6 August 2012
  - Institution: (United States) NASA
- Trace Gas Orbiter (ExoMars 2016)
  - Mission: study methane and other trace gases in the Martian atmosphere
  - Launched: 14 March 2016
  - Destination: Mars
  - Arrival: 19 October 2016 (Mars orbit insertion), 21 April 2018 (final orbit)
  - Institution: ESA
- Emirates Mars Mission
  - Mission: study weather and atmosphere.
  - Launched: 19 July 2020
  - Destination: Mars
  - Arrival: 9 February 2021
  - Institution: (United Arab Emirates) UAESA
- Tianwen-1 orbiter
  - Mission: find evidence for current and past life and produce Martian surface maps. Orbital studies of Martian surface morphology, soil, and atmosphere.
  - Launched: 23 July 2020
  - Destination: Mars
  - Arrival: 10 February 2021
  - Institution: (China) CNSA
- Perseverance rover
  - Mission: searching for evidence of organic material on Mars, and engaging in exploration of the landing site at Jezero crater.
  - Launched: 30 July 2020
  - Destination: Jezero crater, Mars
  - Arrival: 18 February 2021
  - Institution: (United States) NASA
- ESCAPADE
  - Mission: Two orbiters
  - Launched: 13 November 2025
  - Destination: Mars
  - Expected arrival: 2027
  - Institution: (United States) NASA
- Martian Moons eXploration
  - Mission: Phobos sample return, lander, and delivery of a Phobos rover, Idefix
  - Launched: 19 October 2026
  - Destination: Phobos
  - Expected arrival: 2027
  - Institution: (Japan) JAXA

=== Asteroids and comets ===
- Hayabusa2
  - Mission: asteroid study and sample-return
  - Launched: 3 December 2014
  - Destination: 162173 Ryugu
  - Arrival: 27 June 2018
  - Left Ryugu: 12 November 2019
  - Destination: 98943 Torifune
  - Arrival: June 2026
  - Institution: (Japan) JAXA
- OSIRIS-APEX
  - Mission: asteroid study and sample-return
  - Launched: 8 September 2016
  - Destination: 101955 Bennu
  - Arrival: 3 December 2018
  - Left Bennu: 10 May 2021
  - Destination: 99942 Apophis
  - Expected arrival: April 2029
  - Institution: (United States) NASA
- Lucy
  - Mission: to fly by 8 Jupiter trojans and one main-belt asteroid
  - Launched: 16 October 2021
  - Destination: 152830 Dinkinesh
  - Arrival: 1 November 2023
  - Destination: 52246 Donaldjohanson
  - Arrival: 20 April 2025
  - Destination: 3548 Eurybates
  - Expected arrival: 12 August 2027
  - Institution: (United States) NASA
- Psyche
  - Mission: to orbit a main-belt asteroid
  - Launched: 13 October 2023
  - Destination: 16 Psyche
  - Expected arrival: August 2029
  - Institution: (United States) NASA
- Hera
  - Mission: to orbit a binary asteroid and observe the asteroids after the DART impact.
  - Launched: 7 October 2024
  - Destination: 65803 Didymos system
  - Expected arrival: December 2026
  - Institution: (European Union) ESA
- Tianwen-2
  - Mission: asteroid study and sample-return
  - Launched: 29 May 2025
  - Destination: 469219 Kamoʻoalewa
  - Arrival: 7 June 2026
  - Institution: (China) CNSA

=== Heliocentric orbit ===
- Parker Solar Probe
  - Mission: observation of solar wind, magnetic fields, and coronal energy flow.
  - Launched: 12 August 2018
  - Destination: low solar orbit, perihelion 6.9 million km
  - Arrival: 19 January 2019
  - Institution: (United States) NASA
- Solar Orbiter
  - Mission: detailed measurements of the inner heliosphere and nascent solar wind, and close observations of the polar regions of the Sun.
  - Launched: 10 February 2020
  - Destination: High inclination solar orbit
  - Arrival: Operational orbit in 2023
  - Institution: ESA

=== Outer Solar System ===
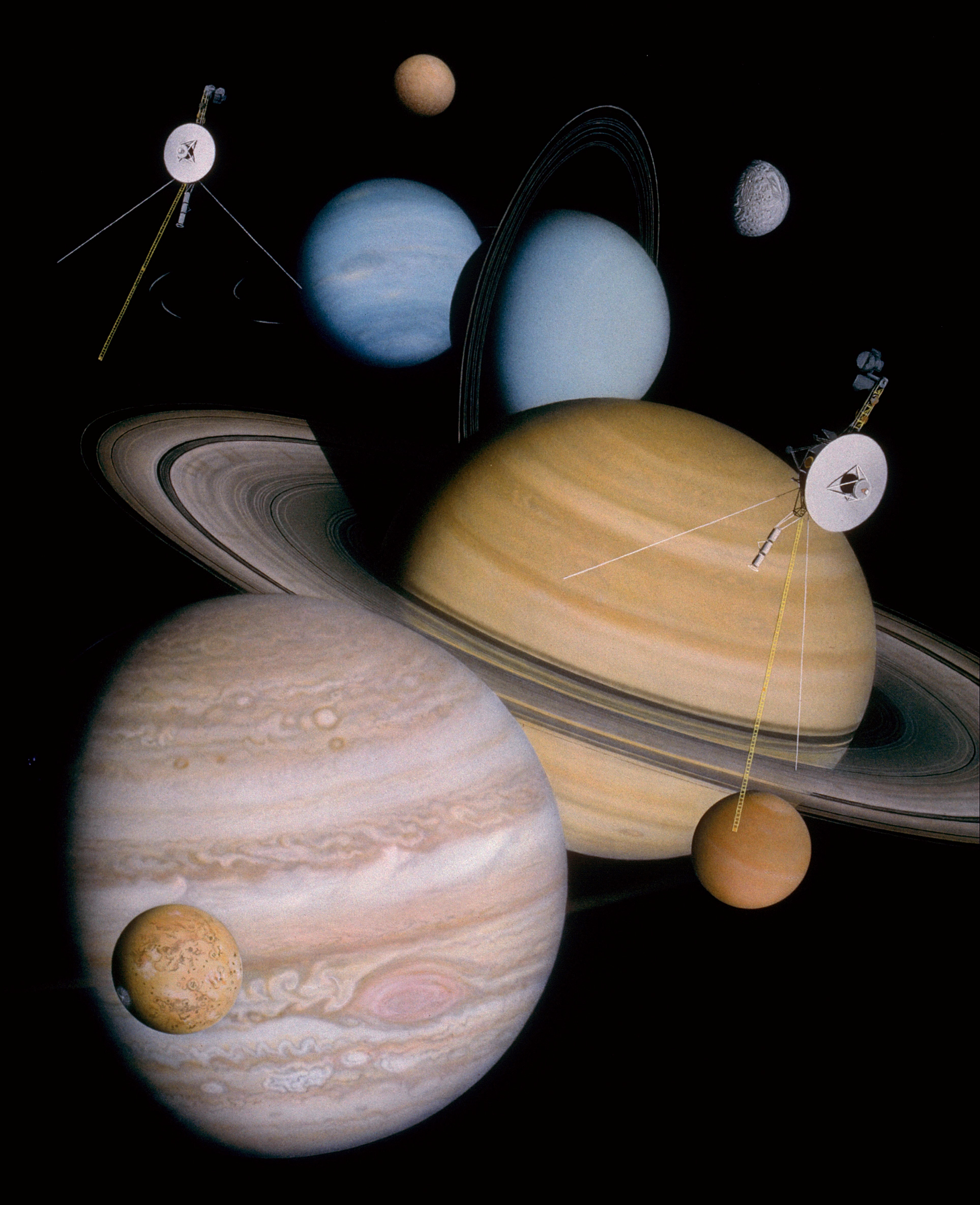
Montage of planets and some moons that the two Voyager spacecraft have visited and studied, still active in the 2020s they are heading out into interstellar space returning data from newly explored distances

==== Jupiter ====
- Juno
  - Mission: studying Jupiter from polar orbit. Originally intended to de-orbit into the Jovian atmosphere after 2021, the mission was extended to 2025 and is still operating as of February 2026.
  - Launched: 5 August 2011
  - Destination: Jupiter
  - Arrival: 4 July 2016
  - Institution: (United States) NASA
- Juice (Jupiter Icy Moons Explorer)
  - Mission: mission to study Jupiter's three icy moons Callisto, Europa and Ganymede, eventually orbiting Ganymede as the first spacecraft to orbit a satellite of another planet.
  - Launched: 14 April 2023
  - Destination: Jupiter
  - Expected arrival: July 2031
  - Destination: Ganymede
  - Expected arrival: December 2034
  - Institution: (European Union) ESA
- Europa Clipper
  - Mission: mission to study Jupiter and Europa.
  - Launched: 14 October 2024
  - Destination: Jupiter
  - Expected arrival: 11 April 2030
  - Institution: (United States) NASA

==== Trans-Neptunian ====
- Voyager 2
  - Mission: studying all four giant planets. This mission was one of NASA's most successful, yielding a wealth of new information. As of November 2017 it is some 116 AU from the Sun (17.34 billion kilometers). It left the heliosphere and crossed into interstellar space in December 2018. As with Voyager 1, scientists are now using Voyager 2 to learn what the Solar System is like beyond the heliosphere.
  - Launched: 20 August 1977
  - Destination: Jupiter, Saturn, Uranus, Neptune
  - Arrival: 9 July 1979
  - Institution: (United States) NASA
  - Primary mission completion: August 1989
  - Current trajectory: entered interstellar space December 2018
- Voyager 1
  - Mission: investigating Jupiter and Saturn, and the moons of these planets. Its continuing data feed offered the first direct measurements of the heliosheath and the heliopause. It is currently the furthest man-made object from Earth, as well as the first object to leave the heliosphere and cross into interstellar space. As of November 2017 it has a distance from the Sun of about 140 astronomical units (AU) (21 billion kilometers, or 0.002 light years), and it will not be overtaken by any other current craft. In August 2012, Voyager 1 became the first human-built spacecraft to enter interstellar space. Though declining, the onboard power source should keep some of the probe's instruments running until 2025.
  - Launched: 5 September 1977
  - Destination: Jupiter and Saturn
  - Arrival: January 1979
  - Institution: (United States) NASA
  - Primary mission completion: November 1980
  - Current trajectory: entered interstellar space August 2012
- New Horizons
  - Mission: the first spacecraft to study Pluto up close, and ultimately the Kuiper Belt. It was the fastest spacecraft when leaving Earth and will be the fifth probe to leave the Solar System.
  - Launched: 19 January 2006
  - Destination: Pluto and Charon
  - Arrival: 14 July 2015
  - Left Charon: 14 July 2015
  - Institution: (United States) NASA

== See also ==
- Lists of spacecraft
