= List of lunar probes =

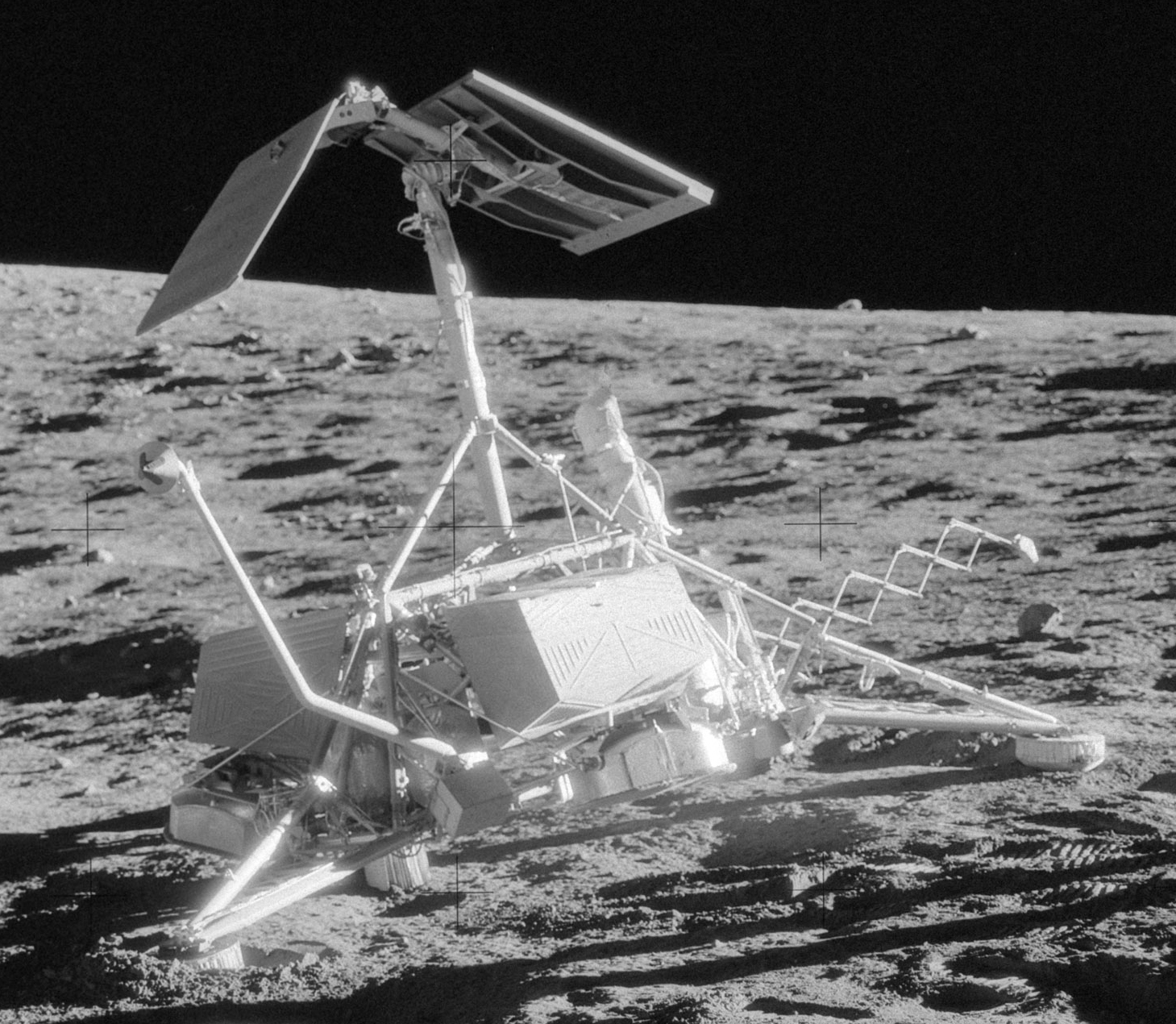
Surveyor 3 on the Moon.

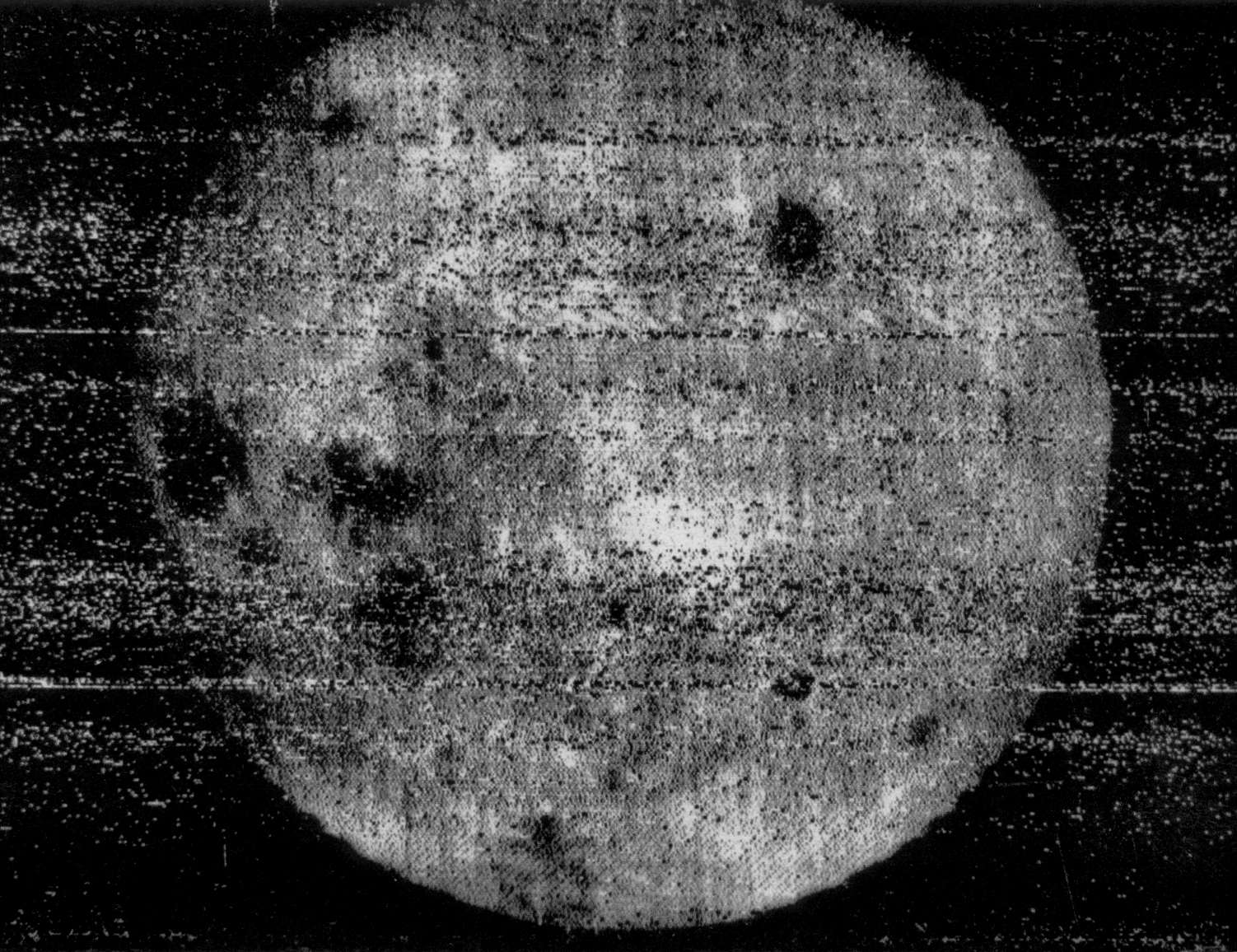
The first image returned by Luna 3 showed the far side of the Moon

This is a list of robotic space probes that have flown by, struck, orbited, landed on, or failed to reach the Moon for lunar exploration.

The crewed Apollo missions are listed at List of missions to the Moon.

Major programs encompassing several probes include:

- Luna program — USSR Lunar exploration (1959–1976)
- Ranger program — US Lunar hard-landing probes (1961–1965)
- Zond program — USSR Lunar exploration (1964–1970)
- Surveyor program — US Lunar soft-landing probe (1966–1968)
- Lunar Orbiter program — US Lunar orbital (1966–1967)
- Lunokhod program — USSR Lunar Rover probes (1970–1973)
- Chang'e program - China Lunar orbiters, landers, rovers and sample return spacecraft (2004–present)
- Chandrayaan programme - Indian Lunar Exploration Programme incorporates lunar orbiters, impactors, soft landers and rover spacecraft (2008–present)
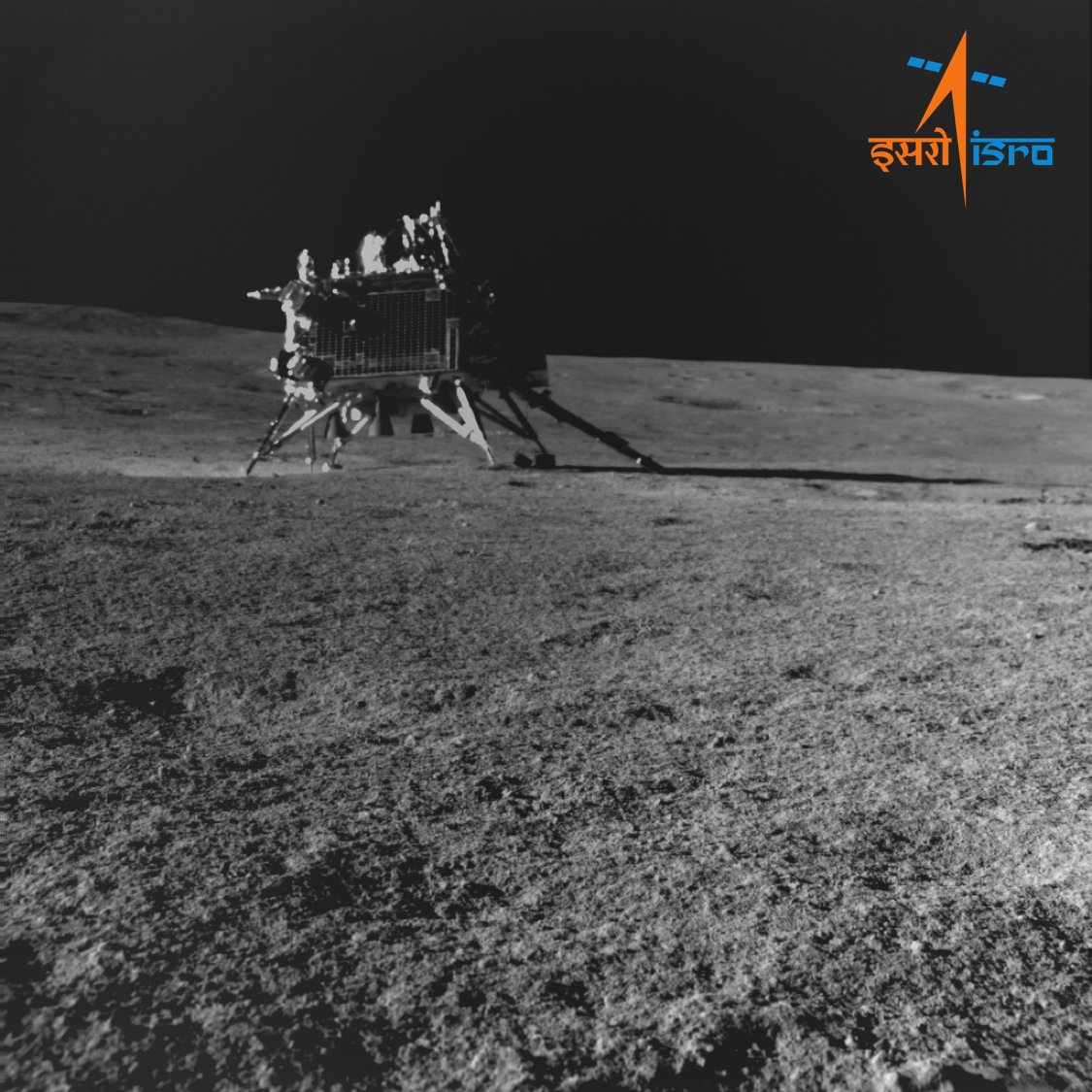
  Chandrayaan-3's lander Vikram on the Moon imaged by rover Pragyan 15 meters away

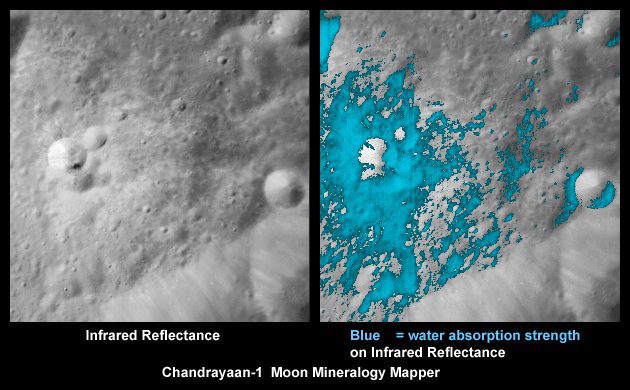
Second confirmation of water on Moon by Chandrayaan-1's Moon Mineralogy Mapper that observed reflectance spectra of water ice.

== Key ==
Colour key:

– Mission or flyby fully or partially completed	– Failed or cancelled mission
– Mission en route or in progress (including mission extensions)	– Planned mission

- ^{†} means "tentatively identified", as classified by NASA . These are Cold War-era Soviet missions, mostly failures, about which few or no details have been officially released. The information given may be speculative.
- Date is the date of:

- closest encounter (flybys)
- impact (impactors)
- orbital insertion to end of mission, whether planned or premature (orbiters)
- landing to end of mission, whether planned or premature (landers)
- launch (missions that never got underway due to failure at or soon after launch)
In cases which do not fit any of the above, the event to which the date refers is stated. Note that as a result of this scheme missions are not always listed in order of launch.

- In the case of flybys (such as gravity assists) that are incidental to the main mission, "success" indicates the completion of the flyby, not necessarily that of the main mission.

== Lunar probes by date ==
=== 1958–1960 ===
Spacecraft	Organization	Date	Type	Status	Notes	Image	Ref
Pioneer 0	(United States) DoD	17 August 1958	orbiter	failure	first attempted launch beyond Earth orbit; launch vehicle failure; maximum altitude 16 km		ABLE1
Luna E-1 No.1	(Soviet Union) USSR	23 September 1958	impactor	failure	launch vehicle failure		
Pioneer 1	(United States) NASA/ DoD	11 October 1958	orbiter	failure	second stage premature shutdown; maximum altitude 113,800 km; some data returned		1958-007A
Luna E-1 No.2	(Soviet Union) USSR	12 October 1958	impactor	failure	launch vehicle failure		
Pioneer 2	(United States) NASA/ STL	8 November 1958	orbiter	failure	third stage failure; maximum altitude 1,550 km; some data returned		PION2
Luna E-1 No.3	(Soviet Union) USSR	4 December 1958	impactor	failure	launch vehicle failure		
Pioneer 3	(United States) NASA/ DoD	6 December 1958	flyby	failure	fuel depletion; maximum altitude 102,360 km; some data returned		1958-008A
Luna 1	(Soviet Union) USSR	4 January 1959	flyby	partial success	first spacecraft in the vicinity of the Moon (flew within 5,995 km, but probably an intended impactor)		1959-012A
Pioneer 4	(United States) NASA/ DoD	4 March 1959	flyby	partial success	achieved distant flyby; first US probe to enter solar orbit		1959-013A
Luna E-1A No.1	(Soviet Union) USSR	18 June 1959	impactor	failure	failed to reach Earth orbit		
Luna 2	(Soviet Union) USSR	14 September 1959	impactor	success	first impact on Moon		1959-014A
Pioneer P-1	(United States) NASA	24 September 1959?	orbiter?	failure	designation sometimes given to a failed launch or launchpad explosion during testing; conflicting information between sources		
Luna 3	(Soviet Union) USSR	6 October 1959	flyby	success	first images from the lunar farside		1959-008A
Pioneer P-3	(United States) NASA	26 November 1959	orbiter	failure	disintegrated shortly after launch		PIONX
Luna 1960A^{†}	(Soviet Union) USSR	15 April 1960	flyby	failure	failed to attain correct trajectory		
Luna 1960B^{†}	(Soviet Union) USSR	16 April 1960	flyby	failure	launch vehicle failure		
Pioneer P-30	(United States) NASA	25 September 1960	orbiter	failure	second stage failure; failed to reach Earth orbit		PIONY
Pioneer P-31	(United States) NASA	15 December 1960	orbiter	failure	first stage failure		PIONZ

=== 1962–1965 ===
Spacecraft	Organization	Date	Type	Status	Notes	Image	Ref
Ranger 3	(United States) NASA	28 January 1962	impactor	failure	missed target		1962-001A
Ranger 4	(United States) NASA	26 April 1962	impactor	failure	hit the lunar farside; no data returned		1962-012A
Ranger 5	(United States) NASA	21 October 1962	impactor	failure	power failure, missed target		1962-055A
Sputnik 25	(Soviet Union) USSR	5 January 1963	lander	failure	failed to escape Earth orbit		1963-001A
Luna E-6 No.3^{†}	(Soviet Union) USSR	2 February 1963	lander?	failure	failed to reach Earth orbit		
Luna 4	(Soviet Union) USSR	5 April 1963	lander?	failure	missed target, became Earth satellite		1963-008B
Ranger 6	(United States) NASA	2 February 1964	impactor	partial success	impacted, but no pictures returned due to power failure		1964-007A
Luna 1964A^{†}	(Soviet Union) USSR	21 March 1964	lander	failure	failed to reach Earth orbit		
Ranger 7	(United States) NASA	31 July 1964	impactor	success	returned pictures until impact		1964-041A
Ranger 8	(United States) NASA	20 February 1965	impactor	success	returned pictures until impact		1965-010A
Cosmos 60	(Soviet Union) USSR	12 March 1965	lander	failure	failed to leave Earth orbit		1965-018A
Ranger 9	(United States) NASA	24 March 1965	impactor	success	TV broadcast of live pictures until impact		1965-023A
Luna 1965A^{†}	(Soviet Union) USSR	10 April 1965	lander	failure	failed to reach Earth orbit?		
Luna 5	(Soviet Union) USSR	12 May 1965	lander	failure	crashed into Moon		1965-036A
Luna 6	(Soviet Union) USSR	8 June 1965	lander	failure	missed Moon		1965-044A
Zond 3	(Soviet Union) USSR	20 July 1965	flyby	success	possibly originally intended as a Mars probe, but target changed after launch window missed		1965-056A
Luna 7	(Soviet Union) USSR	7 October 1965	lander	failure	crashed into Moon		1965-077A
Luna 8	(Soviet Union) USSR	6 December 1965	lander	failure	crashed into Moon		1965-099A

=== 1966–1967 ===
Spacecraft	Organization	Date	Type	Status	Notes	Image	Ref
Luna 9	(Soviet Union) USSR	3 February 1966 – 6 February 1966	lander	success	first soft landing; first images from the surface		1966-006A
Cosmos 111	(Soviet Union) USSR	1 March 1966	orbiter	failure	failed to escape Earth orbit		1966-017A
Luna 10	(Soviet Union) USSR	3 April 1966 – 30 May 1966	orbiter	success	first artificial satellite of the Moon		1966-027A
Luna 1966A^{†}	(Soviet Union) USSR	30 April 1966	orbiter	failure	failed to reach Earth orbit		
Surveyor 1	(United States) NASA	2 June 1966	lander	success	first US soft landing; Surveyor program performed various tests in support of forthcoming human landings		1966-045A
Explorer 33	(United States) NASA	1 July 1966 – 15 September 1971	orbiter	partial success	studied interplanetary plasma, cosmic rays, magnetic fields and solar X rays; failed to attain lunar orbit as intended, but achieved mission objectives from Earth orbit		1966-058A
Lunar Orbiter 1	(United States) NASA	14 August 1966 – 29 October 1966	orbiter	success	photographic mapping of lunar surface; intentionally impacted after completion of mission		1966-073A
Luna 11	(Soviet Union) USSR	28 August 1966 – 1 October 1966	orbiter	success	gamma-ray and X-ray-based observations of Moon's composition; gravity, radiation and meteorite studies		1966-078A
Surveyor 2	(United States) NASA	23 September 1966	lander	failure	crashed into Moon		1966-084A
Luna 12	(Soviet Union) USSR	25 October 1966 – 19 January 1967	orbiter	success	lunar surface photography		1966-094A
Lunar Orbiter 2	(United States) NASA	10 November 1966 – 11 October 1967	orbiter	success	photographic mapping of lunar surface; intentionally impacted after completion of mission		1966-100A
Luna 13	(Soviet Union) USSR	24 December 1966	lander	success	TV pictures of lunar landscape; soil measurements		1966-116A
Lunar Orbiter 3	(United States) NASA	8 February 1967 – 9 October 1967	orbiter	success	photographic mapping of lunar surface; intentionally impacted after completion of mission		1967-008A
Surveyor 3	(United States) NASA	20 April 1967 – 4 May 1967	lander	success	various studies, primarily in support of forthcoming human landings. First lander visited by a later crewed mission (Apollo 12) that even brought its components back to Earth.		1967-035A
Lunar Orbiter 4	(United States) NASA	May–October 1967	orbiter	success	lunar photographic survey		1967-041A
Explorer 35	(United States) NASA	July 1967 – 24 June 1973	orbiter	success	studies of interplanetary plasma, magnetic fields, energetic particles and solar X rays		1967-070A
Surveyor 4	(United States) NASA	17 July 1967	lander	failure	crashed into Moon		1967-068A
Lunar Orbiter 5	(United States) NASA	5 August 1967 – 31 January 1968	orbiter	success	lunar photographic survey; intentionally impacted after completion of mission		1967-075A
Surveyor 5	(United States) NASA	11 September 1967 – 17 December 1967	lander	success	various studies, primarily in support of forthcoming human landings		1967-084A
Zond 1967A^{†}	(Soviet Union) USSR	28 September 1967		failure	lunar capsule test flight; launch failure		
Surveyor 6	(United States) NASA	10 November 1967 – 14 December 1967	lander	success	various studies, primarily in support of forthcoming human landings		1967-112A
Zond 1967B^{†}	(Soviet Union) USSR	22 November 1967		failure	lunar capsule test flight; launch failure		

=== 1968–1970 ===
Spacecraft	Organization	Date	Type	Status	Notes	Image	Ref
Surveyor 7	(United States) NASA	10 January 1968 – 21 February 1968	lander	success	various studies, primarily in support of forthcoming human landings; fifth and final Surveyor mission to achieve soft landing		1968-001A
Luna 1968A^{†}	(Soviet Union) USSR	7 February 1968	orbiter?	failure	failed to reach Earth orbit		
Zond 4	(Soviet Union) USSR	2 March 1968 (launch)			lunar programme flight test, directed away from Moon, either intentionally or unintentionally		1968-013A
Luna 14	(Soviet Union) USSR	10 April 1968 – ?	orbiter	success	tests of radio communications technologies; lunar mascon studies		1968-027A
Zond 1968A^{†}	(Soviet Union) USSR	23 April 1968	flyby?	failure	launch failure		
Zond 5	(Soviet Union) USSR	18 September 1968	flyby	success	bioscience experiments; returned to soft landing on Earth		1968-076A
Zond 6	(Soviet Union) USSR	14 November 1968	flyby	success	cosmic-ray, micrometeoroid and bioscience studies; returned to soft landing on Earth		1968-101A
Zond 1969A^{†}	(Soviet Union) USSR	20 January 1969	flyby	failure	launch aborted		
Luna 1969A^{†}	(Soviet Union) USSR	19 February 1969	lander	failure	launch vehicle failure		
Lunokhod 201^{†}	(Soviet Union) USSR	19 February 1969	rover	failure	launch vehicle failure		
Zond L1S-1^{†}	(Soviet Union) USSR	21 February 1969	orbiter	failure	launch vehicle failure		
Luna 1969B^{†}	(Soviet Union) USSR	15 April 1969	sample return?	failure	launch failure		
Luna 1969C^{†}	(Soviet Union) USSR	14 June 1969	sample return	failure	launch failure		
Zond L1S-2^{†}	(Soviet Union) USSR	3 July 1969	orbiter	failure	launch failure		
Luna 15	(Soviet Union) USSR	21 July 1969	sample return?	failure?	completed 52 lunar orbits then crash-landed		1969-058A
Zond 7	(Soviet Union) USSR	11 August 1969	flyby	success	returned to soft landing on Earth		1969-067A
Cosmos 300	(Soviet Union) USSR	23 September 1969	sample return	failure	failed to escape Earth orbit		1969-080A
Cosmos 305	(Soviet Union) USSR	22 October 1969	sample return	failure	failed to escape Earth orbit		1969-092A
Luna 1970A^{†}	(Soviet Union) USSR	6 February 1970	sample return?	failure	launch vehicle failure		
Luna 1970B^{†}	(Soviet Union) USSR	19 February 1970	orbiter?	failure	launch vehicle failure		
Luna 16	(Soviet Union) USSR	20 September 1970	sample return	success	first robotic sample return		1970-072A
Zond 8	(Soviet Union) USSR	24 October 1970	flyby	success	returned to soft landing on Earth		1970-088A
Luna 17	(Soviet Union) USSR	17 November 1970 – 4 October 1971	lander	success	deployed rover		1970-095A
Lunokhod 1	(Soviet Union) USSR	17 November 1970 – 4 October 1971	rover	success	first robotic rover; travelled over 10 km		1970-095D

=== 1971–1976 ===
Spacecraft	Organization	Date	Type	Status	Notes	Image	Ref
Luna 18	(Soviet Union) USSR	11 September 1971	lander/sample return?	failure	crashed into Moon		1971-073A
Luna 19	(Soviet Union) USSR	3 October 1971 – October 1972	orbiter	success			1971-082A
Luna 20	(Soviet Union) USSR	21 February 1972	sample return	success	second successful robotic sample return		1972-007A
Soyuz L3^{†}	(Soviet Union) USSR	23 November 1972	orbiter	failure	launch failure		
Luna 21	(Soviet Union) USSR	15 January 1973 – May 1973?	lander	success	deployed rover		1973-001A
Lunokhod 2	(Soviet Union) USSR	15 January 1973 – May 1973?	rover	success	second robotic rover; travelled 37 km		1973-001A
Explorer 49	(United States) NASA	15 June 1973 – June 1975	orbiter	success	radio astronomy observations; last US lunar mission until 1994		1973-039A
Mariner 10	(United States) NASA	November 1973	flyby	success	en route to Venus and Mercury		1973-085A
Luna 22	(Soviet Union) USSR	2 June 1974 – November 1974	orbiter	success			1974-037A
Luna 23	(Soviet Union) USSR	6 November 1974	sample return	failure	damaged on landing, sample return failed		1974-084A
Luna 1975A^{†}	(Soviet Union) USSR	16 October 1975	sample return	failure	failed to reach Earth orbit		
Luna 24	(Soviet Union) USSR	18 August 1976	sample return	success	third and final successful sample return in Luna programme		1976-081A

=== 1983–1998 ===
Spacecraft	Organization	Date	Type	Status	Notes	Image	Ref
ICE (formerly ISEE-3)	(United States) NASA	22 December 1983	flyby	success	gravity assist en route to comet flybys		1978-079A
Hiten	(Japan) ISAS	March 1990 – October 1991	flyby (approached 10 times)	success	in Moon-crossing Earth orbit from January 1990, later transferred to lunar orbit after failure of Hagoromo; intentionally impacted on Moon at end of mission; first Japanese probe (and non-USSR/US probe) to enter lunar orbit		1990-007A
Hiten	(Japan) ISAS	February 1992 – April 1993	orbiter	success	in Moon-crossing Earth orbit from January 1990, later transferred to lunar orbit after failure of Hagoromo; intentionally impacted on Moon at end of mission; first Japanese probe (and non-USSR/US probe) to enter lunar orbit		1990-007A
Hagoromo	(Japan) ISAS	March 1990	orbiter	failure	released by Hiten into lunar orbit, but transmitter failed and orbit never confirmed		1990-007A
GEOTAIL	(Japan) ISAS / (United States) NASA	September 1992 – November 1994	flyby (approached 14 times)	success	gravity assist en route magnetotail around L2 / finally deployed into high Earth orbit		
WIND	(United States) NASA	1 December 1994 and 27 December 1994	flyby	success	gravity assists en route to Earth–Sun L1 Lagrangian point		1994-071A
Clementine	(United States) BMDO/ NASA	February – June 1994	orbiter	partial success	lunar and Earth observations and component testing; planned Geographos flyby failed		1994-004A
HGS-1	(United States) Hughes Global Services	May/June 1998	Flyby (orbital correction)		errant communications satellite, flew within 6,200 kilometers of Moon during orbit correction manoeuvres		1997-086A
Lunar Prospector	(United States) NASA	January 1998 – July 1999	orbiter	success	lunar surface mapping; intentionally impacted into polar crater at end of mission to test for liberation of water vapour (not detected)		1998-001A
Nozomi	(Japan) ISAS	24 September 1998	flyby	success	gravity assists on planned mission to Mars		1998-041A
Nozomi	(Japan) ISAS	18 December 1998	flyby	success	gravity assists on planned mission to Mars		1998-041A

=== 2001–2009 ===
Spacecraft	Organization	Date	Type	Status	Notes	Image	Ref
WMAP	(United States) NASA	30 July 2001	flyby	success	gravity assist en route to Earth–Sun L2 Lagrangian point		2001-027A
SMART-1	ESA	13 November 2004 – 3 September 2006	orbiter	success	technology testbed and lunar geological studies; intentionally impacted at end of mission; first European probe to orbit the Moon		2003-043C
STEREO A	(United States) NASA	15 December 2006	flyby	success	gravity assist to enter a heliocentric orbit		2006-047A
STEREO B	(United States) NASA	15 December 2006 and 21 January 2007	flyby	success	gravity assists to enter a heliocentric orbit		2006-047B
SELENE (Kaguya)	(Japan) JAXA	3 October 2007 – 10 June 2009	orbiter	success	mineralogical, geographical, magnetic and gravitational observations		2007-039A
Okina (Relay Star)	(Japan) JAXA	9 October 2007 – 12 February 2009	Kaguya subsatellite	success	relay for Kaguya's Far Side operations		2007-039A
Ouna (VRAD)	(Japan) JAXA	12 October 2007 – 29 June 2009	Kaguya subsatellite	success (still in orbit)	Very Long Baseline Interferometry		2007-039A
Chang'e 1	(China) CNSA	5 November 2007 – 1 March 2009	orbiter	success	3D lunar mapping and geological observations; first Chinese probe to orbit a body besides Earth; impacted to collect data in preparation for future soft landings		2007-051A
Chandrayaan-1	(India) ISRO	8 November 2008 – 29 August 2009	orbiter	success	high resolution 3D mapping, search water in polar region (first detection of water) and spectral analysis of the Moon's surface and inner compositions		2008-052A
Moon Impact Probe (MIP)	(India) ISRO	14 November 2008	impactor	success	test and demonstrate targeting technologies for future soft landings, scientific observation from close range		
Lunar Reconnaissance Orbiter	(United States) NASA	23 June 2009 –	orbiter	in orbit	survey of lunar resources and identification of possible landing sites		2009-031A
LCROSS	(United States) NASA	23 June 2009	flyby	success	consisted of the Shepherding Spacecraft and Centaur upper stage (Earth Departure Upper Stage)		2009-031B
LCROSS Shepherding Spacecraft	(United States) NASA	9 October 2009	impactor	success	analyzed upper-stage impact plume for traces of water liberated from the Moon's surface		2009-031B
LCROSS Earth Departure Upper Stage	(United States) NASA	9 October 2009	impactor	success	analyzed upper-stage impact plume for traces of water liberated from the Moon's surface		2009-031B

=== 2010–2019 ===
Spacecraft	Organization	Date	Type	Status	Notes	Image	Ref
Chang'e 2	(China) CNSA	1 October 2010 – 27 August 2011	orbiter	success	capture high resolution images of the landing zone for Chang'e 3, measure and analyze composition of the surface. Then sent to L2 and on to an asteroid flyby.		2010-050A
ARTEMIS P1	(United States) NASA	2 July 2011 –	orbiter	in orbit	to study the effect of the solar wind on the lunar surface		2007-004B
ARTEMIS P2	(United States) NASA	17 July 2011 –	orbiter	in orbit	to study the effect of the solar wind on the lunar surface		2007-004C
GRAIL A (Ebb)	(United States) NASA	31 December 2011 – 17 December 2012	orbiter	success	mapped the Moon's gravitational field; intentionally impacted at end of mission		2011-046A
GRAIL B (Flow)	(United States) NASA	1 January 2012 – 12 December 2012	orbiter	success	mapped the Moon's gravitational field; intentionally impacted at end of mission		2011-046B
LADEE	(United States) NASA	6 September 2013 – 8 April 2014	orbiter	success	designed to study the lunar exosphere and dust. Intentionally impacted on far side of Moon.		2013-047A
Chang'e 3	(China) CNSA	1 December 2013 -	lander	in progress	soft-landed on the Moon and deployed Yutu rover on 14 December 2013; one functioning instrument as of 1 September 2020		2013-070A
Yutu	(China) CNSA	1 December 2013 – 2016?	rover	success	survived multiple lunar nights, became immobile 42 days after landing		2013-070C
Chang'e 5-T1	(China) CNSA	28 October 2014	flyby	success	Technology demonstrator for Chang'e 5 mission; after separating the Xiaofei reentry capsule, the service module eventually entered lunar orbit to conduct rendezvous exercises		2014-065A
Chang'e 5-T1	(China) CNSA	10 January 2015 –	orbiter	in progress	Technology demonstrator for Chang'e 5 mission; after separating the Xiaofei reentry capsule, the service module eventually entered lunar orbit to conduct rendezvous exercises		2014-065A
Manfred Memorial Moon Mission	(Luxembourg) Luxspace	October 2014	flyby/impactor (post mission)	success	privately funded payload attached to a Long March 3C rocket third stage; its dosimeter measured ionizing radiation in space. Unintentional Impact on 4 March 2022.		
TESS	(United States) NASA	17 May 2018	flyby	success	gravity assist to achieve a lunar resonant high Earth orbit		2018-038A
Queqiao	(China) CNSA	25 May 2018	flyby	success	Used a gravity assist en route to the Earth–Moon L_{2} Lagrangian point. Currently serving as relay for Chang'e 4 lander and rover on the far side.		2018-045A
Longjiang-1	(China) HIT	25 May 2018	orbiter	failure	malfunctioned after launch, became flyby		2018-045B
Longjiang-2	(China) HIT	25 May 2018 – 31 July 2019	orbiter	success	Very Long Baseline Interferometry, in orbit until 31 July 2019 when it was deliberately directed to crash onto the Moon.		2018-045C
Chang'e 4	(China) CNSA	7 December 2018 –	lander	in progress	First spacecraft to soft land on the far side of the Moon.		2018-103A
Yutu-2	(China) CNSA	7 December 2018 –	rover	active			
Beresheet	(Israel) SpaceIL	22 February 2019 – 11 April 2019	lander	failure	First Israeli and privately funded lunar lander. Entered lunar orbit on 4 April, hard-landed on 11 April 2019.		2019-009B
Chandrayaan-2	(India) ISRO	22 July 2019 –	orbiter	in orbit	observe lunar geography and mineralogy, search for water molecules		2019-042A
Vikram	(India) ISRO	6 September 2019	lander	failure	crashed due to a software glitch		
Pragyan	(India) ISRO	7 September 2019	rover	not deployed	was to be deployed from Vikram		

=== 2020–present ===
Spacecraft	Organization	Date	Type	Status	Notes	Image	Ref
Chang'e 5	(China) CNSA	16 December 2020	sample return	success	Retrieved 1.731 kg of lunar sample and returned it to Earth		2020-087A
Chang'e 5 Lander	(China) CNSA	30 November 2020 - 11 December 2020	sample return	success	Obtained lunar sample and placed on ascent vehicle; conducted radar studies of underground structure		2020-087A
Chang'e 5 Ascender	(China) CNSA	3 December 2020 - 7 December 2020	sample return	success	Transferred lunar sample onto return capsule via lunar-orbit rendezvous; intentionally deorbited		2020-087A
Chang'e 5 Orbiter	(China) CNSA	9 September 2021	flyby	success	Extended mission following separation of Chang'e 5 Returner; returned from Sun-Earth L_{1} to conduct lunar flyby		2020-087A
Chang'e 5 Orbiter	(China) CNSA	Late 2021 -	orbiter	in orbit	First spacecraft to utilize Distant Retrograde Orbit (DRO) about Earth-Moon L_{1} and L_{2}		2020-087A
CAPSTONE	(United States) NASA	14 November 2022	orbiter	in orbit	Lunar orbiting CubeSat that will test and verify the calculated orbital stability planned for the Gateway space station.		CAPSTONE
Artemis 1 Orion MPCV CM-002	(United States) NASA	21 November 2022	flyby	success	Uncrewed test of the Orion spacecraft in lunar flyby and DRO orbit.		ARTEMIS-1
Artemis 1 Orion MPCV CM-002	(United States) NASA	25 November 2022	orbiter	success	Uncrewed test of the Orion spacecraft in lunar flyby and DRO orbit.		ARTEMIS-1
Artemis 1 Orion MPCV CM-002	(United States) NASA	5 December 2022	flyby	success	Uncrewed test of the Orion spacecraft in lunar flyby and DRO orbit.		ARTEMIS-1
LunaH-Map	(United States) NASA	21 November 2022 (flyby)	orbiter	failure	intended to perform engine burn to achieve a lunar orbit to search for evidence of lunar water ice inside permanently shadowed craters using its neutron detector. Orbit insertion failed possibly due to a struck valve. The mission was terminated after six month in solar orbit.		LUNAH-MAP
Lunar IceCube	(United States) NASA	21 November 2022 (flyby)	orbiter	failure	intended to perform engine burn to achieve a lunar orbit to use its infrared spectrometer to detect water and organic compounds in the lunar surface and exosphere.		L-ICECUBE
EQUULEUS	(Japan) JAXA	21 November 2022	flyby	success	image the Earth's plasmasphere, impact craters on the Moon's far side and L2 experiments.		EQUULEUS
LunIR	(United States) Lockheed Martin	21 November 2022	flyby	failure	image surface thermography, failed to observe the Moon due to faulty communication		LUNIR
NEA Scout	(United States) NASA	21 November 2022	flyby	failure	Solar sail intended to flyby a near-Earth asteroid. Communication failure.		NEA-SCOUT
ArgoMoon	(Italy) ASI	21 November 2022	flyby	success	image the ICPS and perform deep space Nanotechnology experiments.		ARGOMOON
OMOTENASHI solid motor and orbiting module	(Japan) JAXA	21 November 2022 (flyby)	impactor	failure	intentional impact after separation from surface probe. Prepares the trajectory for landing of surface probe. Communication failure, missed target		OMOTENASH
OMOTENASHI surface probe	(Japan) JAXA	21 November 2022 (flyby)	semi-hard lander	failure	inflatable module attempting to land semi-hard at lunar surface. Communication failure, missed target		OMOTENASH
CuSP	(United States) NASA	21 November 2022	flyby	failure	mission to study particles and magnetic fields. Did lunar flyby due to launch trajectory.		CUSP
BioSentinel	(United States) NASA	21 November 2022	flyby	success	it contains yeast cards that will be rehydrated in space, designed to detect, measure, and compare the effects of deep space radiation.		BIOSENTNL
Team Miles	(United States) Fluid & Reason	21 November 2022	flyby	failure	demonstrate low-thrust plasma propulsion in deep space.		TEAMMILES
Danuri (Korea Pathfinder Lunar Orbiter)	(South Korea) KARI/ (United States) NASA	16 December 2022	orbiter	in orbit	Lunar Orbiter by the Korea Aerospace Research Institute (KARI) of South Korea. The orbiter, its science payload and ground control infrastructure are technology demonstrators. The orbiter will also be tasked with surveying lunar resources such as water ice, uranium, helium-3, silicon, and aluminium, and produce a topographic map to help select future lunar landing sites.		KPLO
Hakuto-R Mission 1	(Japan) ispace	25 April 2023	lander	failure	Lunar lander technology demonstration. Launched on 11 December 2022, orbit insertion on 21 March 2023, crashed on lunar surface on 25 April 2023 during landing attempt.		HAKUTO-R1
Rashid	(United Arab Emirates) UAESA/MBRSC	25 April 2023	rover	failure	Lunar rover, part of the Emirates Lunar Mission.		HAKUTO-R1
SORA-Q	(Japan) JAXA/Tomy/Doshisha University	25 April 2023	rover	failure	Lunar rover technology demonstration.		HAKUTO-R1
Lunar Flashlight	(United States) NASA	11 December 2022 (launch)	orbiter	failure	was to enter a near-rectilinear halo orbit; couldn't leave Earth orbit due to propulsion failures.		L-FLASHLT
Juice	(Europe) ESA	19 August 2024	flyby	success	gravity assist en route to Jupiter.		
Chandrayaan-3	(India) ISRO	14 July 2023 (launch); 5 August 2023 (orbit insertion)	orbiter	success	bring the lander from Earth parking orbit to pre-landing 100 km (62 mi) lunar orbit and study the spectral and polarimetric measurements of Earth from the lunar orbit. The spacecraft entered lunar orbit on 5 August, and India became the first country to touch down near the lunar south pole, at 69°S, the southernmost lunar landing on 23 August 2023 at 18:03 IST (12:33 UTC).		CHANDRYN3
Vikram	(India) ISRO	23 August 2023	lander	success	primary objective is to redo Chandrayaan-2 landing which had failed. In-site observation & conducting experiments on the materials available on the lunar surface to better understand composition of the Moon.		CHANDRYN3
Pragyan	(India) ISRO	23 August 2023	rover	success	stowed inside lander. Demonstrating the rover's loitering capabilities on the Moon. In-site observation and conducting experiments on the materials available on the lunar surface to better understand composition of the Moon.		CHANDRYN3
Chandrayaan-3 Propulsion Module	(India) ISRO	Between 13 October and 10 November 2023	4 flybys	success	Extended mission following lunar orbit operations to returning to Earth orbit		CHANDRYN3
Luna 25	(Russia) Roscosmos	19 August 2023	lander	failure	Launched 10 August 2023, orbit insertion 16 August 2023, crashed on lunar surface on 19 August 2023 following an anomalous orbital lowering maneuver.		LUNA-25
SLIM	(Japan) JAXA	19 January 2024	gravity assist/lander	success	Successfully demonstrated precision landing by landing within 100 m (330 ft) of its target spot. Its solar cells were initially not generating electricity due to wrong attitude but in ten days the Sun moved enough to temporarily provide power to the spacecraft.		SLIM
LEV-1	(Japan) JAXA	19 January 2024	rover	success	Lunar rover with a hopping mechanism. Conducted six hops on lunar surface.		SLIM
LEV-2 (SORA-Q)	(Japan) JAXA/Tomy/Doshisha University	19 January 2024	rover	success	Lunar rover, reflight of the SORA-Q rover launched with the failed Hakuto-R Mission 1. Imaged SLIM lander on lunar surface.		SLIM
Peregrine	(United States) Astrobotic Technology	8 January 2024 (launch)	lander	failure	Lunar lander selected for NASA's Commercial Lunar Payload Services carrying a total of 25 payloads. Landing abandoned due to excessive propellant leak.		PEREGRN-1
Colmena × 5	(Mexico) UNAM	8 January 2024 (launch)	rover	failure	Five small robots that will be catapulted onto the lunar surface. Mission phased out along with landing of Peregrine lander due to excessive propellant leak.		PEREGRN-1
Iris	(United States) CMU	8 January 2024 (launch)	rover	failure	Lunar rover, will test small, lightweight rover mobility on the Moon, and collect scientific images for geological sciences. Mission phased out along with landing of Peregrine lander due to excessive propellant leak.		PEREGRN-1
IM-1 Odysseus	(United States) Intuitive Machines	22 February 2024	lander	success	Lunar lander selected for NASA's Commercial Lunar Payload Services carrying a total of 6 payloads.		IM-1-NOVA
EagleCam	(United States) Embry–Riddle Aeronautical University	28 February 2024	semi-hard lander	failure	Deployable camera designed to attempt to capture the first third-person images of a lunar landing. Ejected post landing due to technical issues, failed to return images.		IM-1-NOVA
DRO-A	(China) CAS	13 March 2024 (launch)	orbiter	in orbit	YZ-1S upper stage failed to deliver spacecraft into correct orbit. The satellites were intended to test Distant retrograde orbit. Tracking data appears to show China is attempting to salvage spacecraft and they appear to have succeeded in reaching their desired orbit.		2024-048A
DRO-B	(China) CAS	13 March 2024 (launch)	orbiter	in orbit	YZ-1S upper stage failed to deliver spacecraft into correct orbit. The satellites were intended to test Distant retrograde orbit. Tracking data appears to show China is attempting to salvage spacecraft and they appear to have succeeded in reaching their desired orbit.		2024-048A
Queqiao-2	(China) CNSA	24 March 2024	orbiter	in orbit	Lunar far side relay satellite.		QUEQIAO-2
Tiandu-1	(China) Deep Space Exploration Laboratory	24 March 2024	orbiter	in orbit	will test communications for future lunar satellite constellation technologies.		QUEQIAO-2
Tiandu-2	(China) Deep Space Exploration Laboratory	24 March 2024	orbiter	in orbit	will test communications for future lunar satellite constellation technologies.		QUEQIAO-2
Chang'e 6	(China) CNSA	3 May 2024	sample return	operational	First sample-return from the South Pole–Aitken basin on the far side of the Moon.		CHANG-E-6
Chang'e 6 Lander	(China) CNSA	1 June 2024 -	sample return	success	Obtained lunar sample and placed on ascent vehicle; conducted radar studies of underground structure		CHANG-E-6
Chang'e 6 Ascender	(China) CNSA	3 June 2024 - 7 June 2024	sample return	success	Transferred lunar sample to return capsule on 6 June 2024 after lunar-orbit rendezvous; deorbited		CHANG-E-6
Jinchan rover	(China) CNSA	3 May 2024	sample return	success	Conduct infrared spectroscopy of lunar surface and imaged Chang'e 6 lander on lunar surface.		CHANG-E-6
Chang'e 6 Orbiter	(China) CNSA	8 May 2024 - 20 June 2024	orbiter	success	On extended mission orbiting Sun-Earth L_{2}		CHANG-E-6
ICUBE-Q	(Pakistan) SUPARCO	3 May 2024	orbiter	operational	Pakistan's first lunar mission.		CHANG-E-6
Blue Ghost M1	(United States) Firefly Aerospace	15 January 2025 (launch); 2 March 2025 (landing)	lander	success	Lunar lander technology demonstration. Part of NASA's CLPS contract. First ever soft landing by a private company. First successful American lunar lander after over 52 years, the last being Apollo 17. Completed all objectives after landing in Mare Crisium on March 2, including deep-surface drilling and fortuitous observation of lunar eclipse from lunar nearside, having operated for 346 continuous hours. Mission ended on March 16 upon passing into lunar night, and probe powered down. The landing was live-streamed from command center. First ever video of lunar final descent sequence and landing. First fully successful CLPS contract.		BLUEGHOST
Hakuto-R Mission 2	(Japan) ispace	5 June 2025	lander	failure	Lunar lander technology demonstration. Launched on 15 January 2025, orbit insertion on 6 May 2025, crashed on lunar surface on 5 June 2025 during landing attempt.		RESILIENC
Tenacious Rover	(Luxembourg) Ispace Europe	5 June 2025	rover	failure	Lunar rover to collect lunar resources.		RESILIENC
IM-2 Athena	(United States) Intuitive Machines	27 February 2025 (launch); 6 March 2025 (landing)	lander	partial failure	Lunar lander contracted under NASA's Commercial Lunar Payload Services and carrying various scientific payloads. Probe suffered laser altimeter failure 3 minutes prior to south polar touchdown, leading to descent stage continuing to fire after landing. Slid sideways and toppled into a shadowed crater. Mission terminated due to insufficient solar power on March 7, after 13 hours of much limited operations. This is the second (partially successful) lunar landing by Intuitive Machines.		2025-038A
Micro-Nova hopper	(United States) Intuitive Machines	27 February 2025 (launch); 6 March 2025 (landing)	hopper	failure	Lunar hopper, exploring multiple difficult-to-reach areas such as deep craters on the lunar surface, by firing hydrazine rockets in controlled bursts to propel itself short distances. It will hop across craters in search of lunar ice, which could contain water critical to future crewed missions to the Moon.		2025-038A
AstroAnt rover	(United States) MIT	27 February 2025 (launch); 6 March 2025 (landing)	rover	failure	Lunar miniature rover, the size of a matchbox, to conduct contactless temperature measurements as it drives around on MAPP's roof.		2025-038A
MAPP LV1 rover	(United States) (Finland) Lunar Outpost / Nokia	27 February 2025 (launch); 6 March 2025 (landing)	rover	failure	Lunar rover to collect lunar samples for NASA under a contract worth just $1, which is symbolic of a new incentive for the emerging commercial space industry to access resources in space. It will also autonomously map the lunar surface, capture stereo images and thermal data, and inspect samples of lunar regolith in a special bin mounted on its wheels.		2025-038A
Yaoki rover	(Japan) Dymon	27 February 2025 (launch); 6 March 2025 (landing)	rover	failure	Lunar rover to test mobility technologies.		2025-038A
Lunar Trailblazer	(United States) NASA	3 March 2025 (flyby)	orbiter	failure	Intended to achieve a lunar orbit to aid in the understanding of lunar water and the Moon's water cycle.		2025-038C
Brokkr-2	(United States) AstroForge	3 March 2025	flyby	failure	Asteroid probe intended to flyby the near-Earth asteroid 2022 OB5. Communication failure.		2025-038D
Chimera-1	(United States) Epic Aerospace	3 March 2025	flyby	failure?	Space tug planned TLI to Geosynchronous. Communication failure?		

== See also ==
- Lists of spacecraft
- List of landings on extraterrestrial bodies
- List of missions to the Moon
- List of Solar System probes
- Robotic spacecraft
- Timeline of Solar System exploration
