= Libration point orbit =

Quasiperiodic orbit around a Lagrange point

In orbital mechanics, a libration point orbit (LPO) is a quasiperiodic orbit around a Lagrange point. Libration is a form of orbital motion exhibited, for example, in the Earth–Moon system. Trojan bodies also exhibit libration dynamics.

Two varieties of libration point orbits amenable to Lyapunov stability are halo orbits and Lissajous orbits

The James Webb Space Telescope (JWST) is in a libration point orbit around the L2 Lagrange point of the Sun, and Earth-Moon barycenters. Because libration point orbits are quasiperiodic, the telescope must make frequent small burns to maintain proximity to the L2 point, as part of orbital station keeping, limiting the lifespan of the telescope due to depletion of fuel reserves.

Early simulations of the JWST obtained a high confidence in achieving a ten-year operational lifespan before station keeping becomes untenable. However thanks to a highly accurate launch, it is now thought the telescope could keep its station for up to twenty or even twenty-five years. Some years of intermittent service after that might also be tenable, because of the slow drift rate out of, or in to, the Lagrange point.
