= Space segment =

Satellite system space components

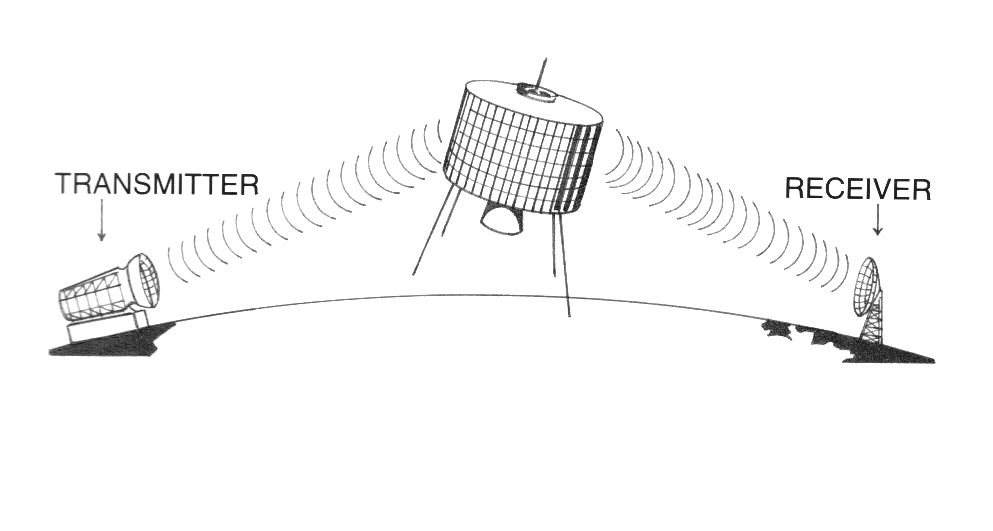
A telecommunications satellite. The space segment comprises the uplink, the satellite itself, and the downlink

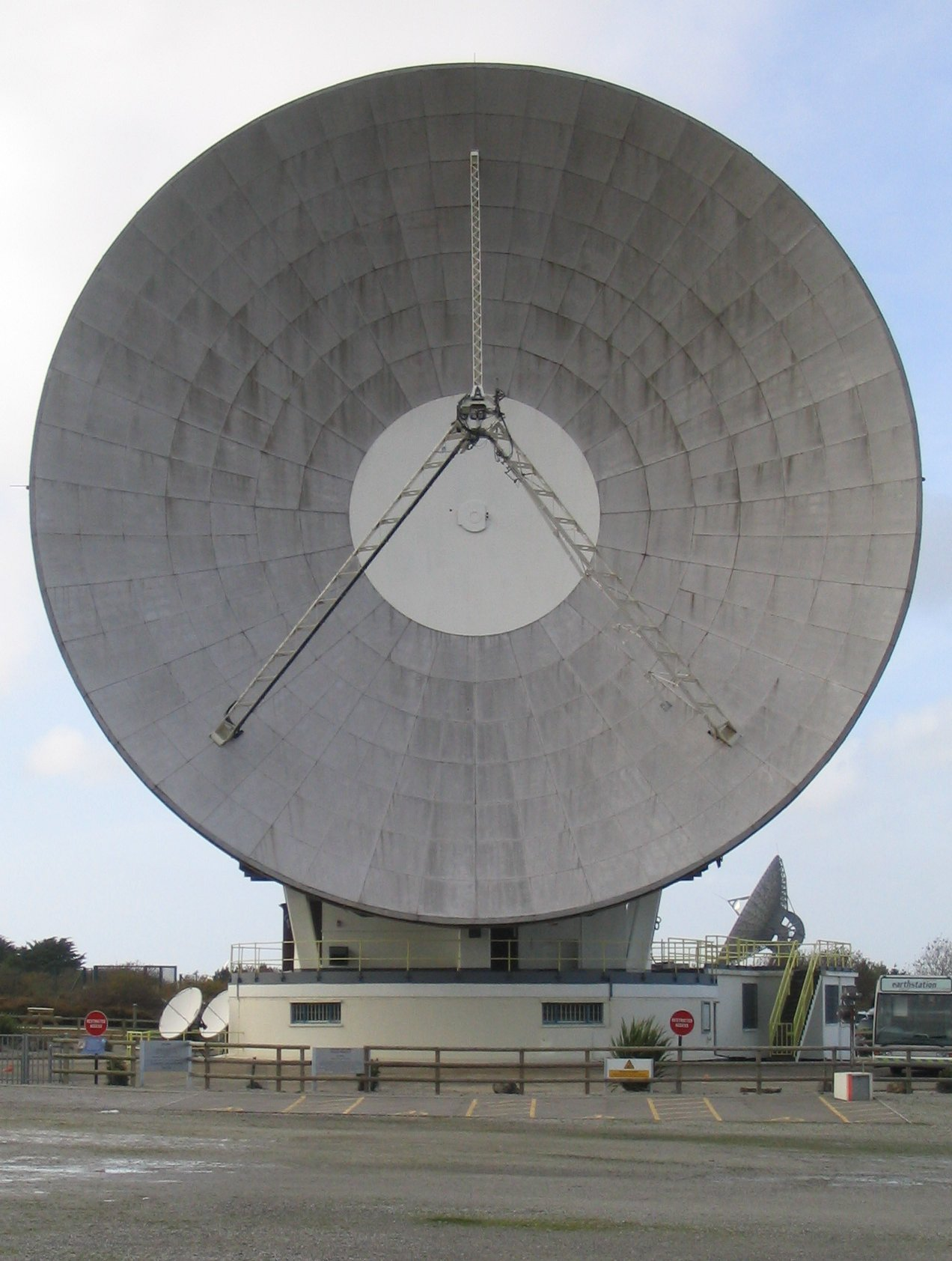
A large parabolic antenna in a satellite Earth station

The space segment of an artificial satellite system is one of its three operational components (the others being the user and ground segments). It comprises the satellite or satellite constellation and the uplink and downlink satellite links.

The overall design of the payload, satellite, ground segment, and end-to-end system is a complex task. Satellite communications payload design must be properly coupled with the capabilities and interaction with the spacecraft bus that provides power, stability and environmental support to the payload.

== Telecommunications satellites ==
Geostationary Earth orbit (GEO) supports businesses in satellite television and radio broadcasting, as well as data and mobile communications. The medium Earth orbit (MEO) and low Earth orbit (LEO) configurations can also be used for various applications.

A communications satellite is composed of a communications payload (repeater and antenna) and supporting spacecraft bus (including solar arrays and batteries, attitude and orbit control systems, structure and thermal control system), and is placed in orbit by a launch vehicle. A successful satellite operator needs the right orbital slot or constellation, and satellites that deliver effective power and bandwidth to desirable regions and markets (i.e., those with growing demand for satellite services). As of 2022, satellite radio serves nearly 32 million subscribers and satellite mobile telephone and data operators offer connectivity throughout the globe. Broadband mobile terminals now provide improved access to the Internet for a range of applications, including videoconferencing.

== See also ==
- Comparison of communication satellite operators
