= Lissajous orbit =

Quasi-periodic orbital trajectory

Animation of WMAP's trajectory

Oblique view

Viewed from Earth

Earth · WMAP

In orbital mechanics, a Lissajous orbit (pronounced [li.sa.ʒu]), named after Jules Antoine Lissajous, is a quasi-periodic orbital trajectory that an object can follow around a Lagrangian point of a three-body system with minimal propulsion, tracing a Lissajous curve. Lyapunov orbits around a Lagrangian point are plane curves that lie entirely in the plane of the two primary bodies. In contrast, Lissajous orbits are space curves and include components in this plane and perpendicular to it. Halo orbits also include components perpendicular to the plane, but they are periodic, while Lissajous orbits are usually not.

In practice, any orbits around Lagrangian points L_{1}, L_{2}, or L_{3} are dynamically unstable, meaning small departures from equilibrium grow over time. As a result, spacecraft in these Lagrangian point orbits must use their propulsion systems to perform orbital station-keeping. Although they are not perfectly stable, a modest effort of station keeping keeps a spacecraft in a desired Lissajous orbit for a long time.

In the absence of other influences, orbits about Lagrangian points L_{4} and L_{5} are dynamically stable so long as the ratio of the masses of the two main objects is greater than about 24.96. The natural dynamics keep the spacecraft (or natural celestial body) in the vicinity of the Lagrangian point without use of a propulsion system, even when slightly perturbed from equilibrium. These orbits can however be destabilized by other nearby massive objects. For example, orbits around the L_{4} and L_{5} points in the Earth–Moon system can last only a few million years instead of billions because of perturbations by the other planets in the Solar System.

== Spacecraft using Lissajous orbits ==
Several missions have used Lissajous orbits: ACE at Sun–Earth L1, SOHO at Sun–Earth L1, DSCOVR at Sun–Earth L1, WMAP at Sun–Earth L2, and also the Genesis mission collecting solar particles at L1. On 14 May 2009, the European Space Agency (ESA) launched into space the Herschel and Planck observatories, both of which use Lissajous orbits at Sun–Earth L2.

ESA's Gaia mission also uses a Lissajous orbit at Sun–Earth L2.

In 2011, NASA transferred two of its THEMIS spacecraft from Earth orbit to Lunar orbit by way of Earth–Moon L1 and L2 Lissajous orbits.

In June 2018, Queqiao, the relay satellite for China's Chang'e 4 lunar lander mission, entered orbit around Earth-Moon L2. (Note: Possibly a halo orbit. Sources disagree.)

== Fictional appearances ==
In the 2005 science fiction novel Sunstorm by Arthur C. Clarke and Stephen Baxter, a huge shield is constructed in space to protect the Earth from a deadly solar storm. The shield is described to have been in a Lissajous orbit at L_{1}. In the story a group of wealthy and powerful people shelter opposite the shield at L_{2} so as to be protected from the solar storm by the shield, the Earth and the Moon.

In the 2017 science fiction novel Artemis by Andy Weir, a Lissajous orbit is used as a transfer point for routine travel to and from the Moon.

== See also ==
- Libration point orbit
