= Queqiao-2 =

Chinese lunar communications satellite

Queqiao 2
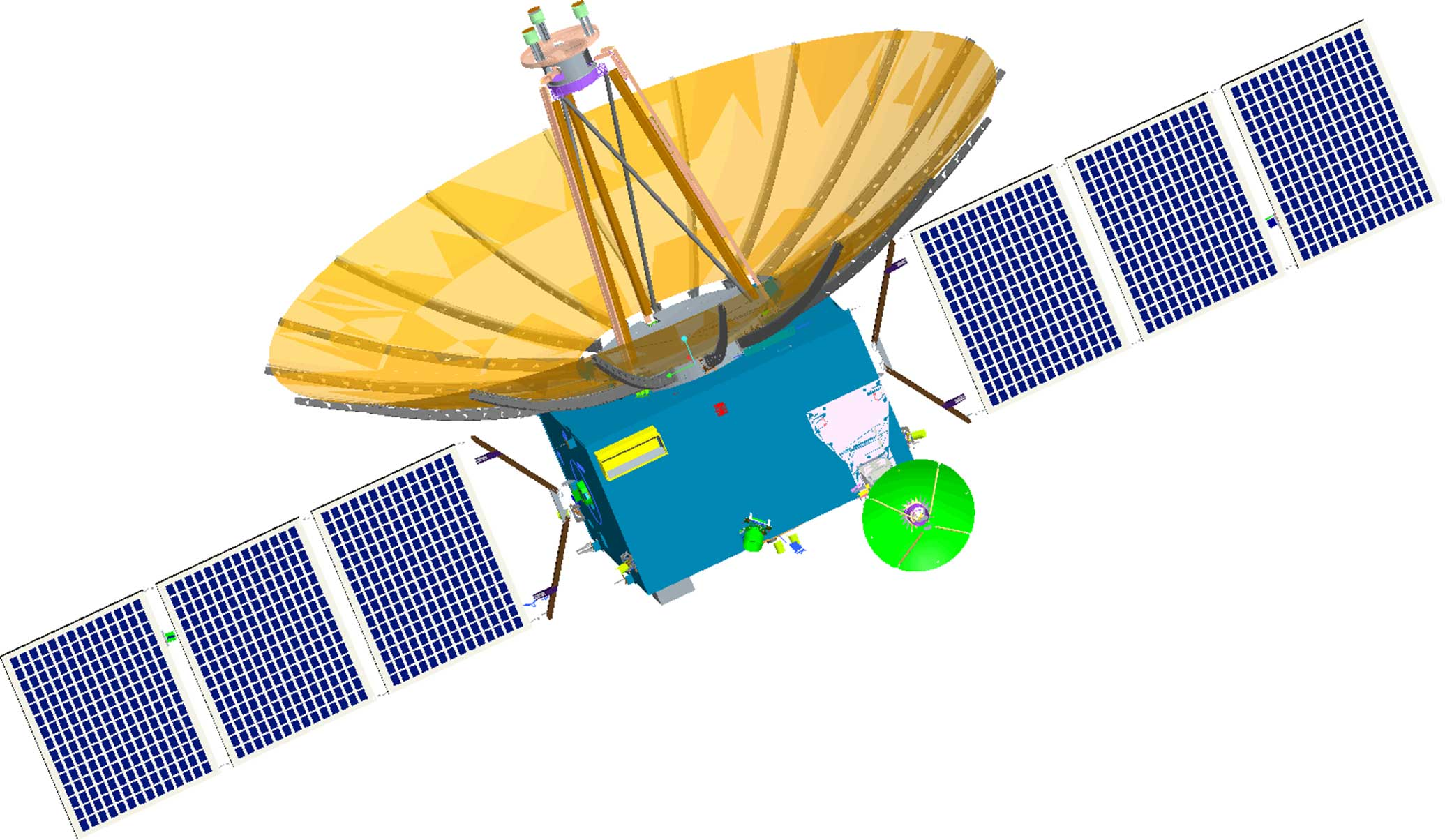
- Rendering of Queqiao 2 satellite
- Mission type: Communication relay Radio astronomy
- Operator: CNSA
- COSPAR ID: 2024-051A
- SATCAT no.: 59276
- Mission duration: Planned: 8-10 years 2 years, 6 months, 28 days (in progress)

Spacecraft properties
- Bus: CAST-2000
- Manufacturer: DFH Satellite Company LTD
- Dry mass: 1,200 kilograms (2,600 lb)
- Dimensions: Antenna: 4.2 metres (14 ft) in diameter
- Power: 1350W

Start of mission
- Launch date: 20 March 2024, 00:31:28 UTC
- Rocket: Long March 8
- Launch site: Wenchang LC-201

Orbital parameters
- Reference system: Selenocentric frozen orbit
- Periselene altitude: 254.3 km (158.0 mi)
- Aposelene altitude: 16,941.1 km (10,526.7 mi)
- Inclination: 119.249°
- Period: 26.18 hours

Lunar orbiter
- Orbital insertion: 24 March 2024, 17:05 UTC

Instruments
- Grid-based Energetic Neutral Atom imager (GENA); Extreme Ultraviolet Camera (EUC); Lunar Orbit VLBI EXperiment (LOVEX)

Queqiao-2 relay satellite (Chinese: 鹊桥二号中继卫星; pinyin: Quèqiáo èr hào zhōngjì wèixīng; lit. 'Magpie Bridge 2 relay satellite') is the second of the communications relay and radio astronomy satellites designed to support the fourth phase of the Chinese Lunar Exploration Program, after Queqiao-1 launched in 2018. The China National Space Administration (CNSA) launched the Queqiao-2 relay satellite on 20 March 2024 to an elliptical frozen orbit around the Moon to support communications from the far side of the Moon and the Lunar south pole.

The name Queqiao (ch'wuh-ch'yow, "Magpie Bridge") was inspired by and came from the Chinese tale The Cowherd and the Weaver Girl.

== Background and mission planning ==
The initial phase of the International Lunar Research Station (ILRS), consisting of the Chang'e 7 and Chang'e 8 probes, was scheduled to be built in 2026 and 2028 on the southern edge of the South Pole–Aitken basin located on the far side of the Moon. While the Queqiao so far only had to connect with two probes on the far side of the Moon (Chang'e 4 lander and Yutu-2 rover), future mission would include more workload, with up to ten robots being active on the moon for the ILRS project, which requires a complex and sophisticated communication network.

The Queqiao relay satellite was inserted in a halo orbit around the Earth-Moon L_{2} since 2018. China planned another relay satellite, called Queqiao 2, to support and supplement Queqiao-1. Originally, the idea was to design the relay satellite as an improved version of the Queqiao and launch it together with the Chang'e 7 probe. After a project revision, the Center for Lunar Exploration and Space Projects at the CNSA decided to launch it separately. This allowed the building of a larger variant of the relay satellite that could be launched earlier and used in the Chang'e 6 sample return mission that was also launched in 2024 to the Apollo crater on the far side of the Moon.

Although the first Queqiao can provide the unique function of relaying constant communications to and from the far side of the Moon, aided by Chinese Deep Space Network, its halo orbits around the Earth-Moon L_{1} and L_{2} were inherently unstable and requires the satellite to consumes 80 g (2.8 oz) of fuel for a small orbit correction maneuver approximately every 9 days. Therefore, a frozen elliptic orbit around the Moon itself was chosen for Queqiao 2 due to its more stable nature. The frozen elliptic orbit can provide visual contact with the Moon for eight hours, i.e., two-thirds of its 12-hour orbit, since the point of its periselene lies above the side of the southern polar region facing away from the Earth.

When Queqiao-2 reaches a position about 200 km from the lunar surface, it will perform capture braking and enter a lunar parking orbit of 200 × 100,000 km with a period of about 10 days. Eventually, Queqiao-2 will enter a large elliptical frozen orbit of 200 × 16,000 km with a period of 24 hours, which is inclined at 62.4° to the equator. No further orbit correction maneuvers are necessary for a period of 10 years, the assumed lifespan of the satellite. However, it did not enter that orbit and instead entered a 119.25° 254 × 16941 km retrograde orbit.

== Design ==
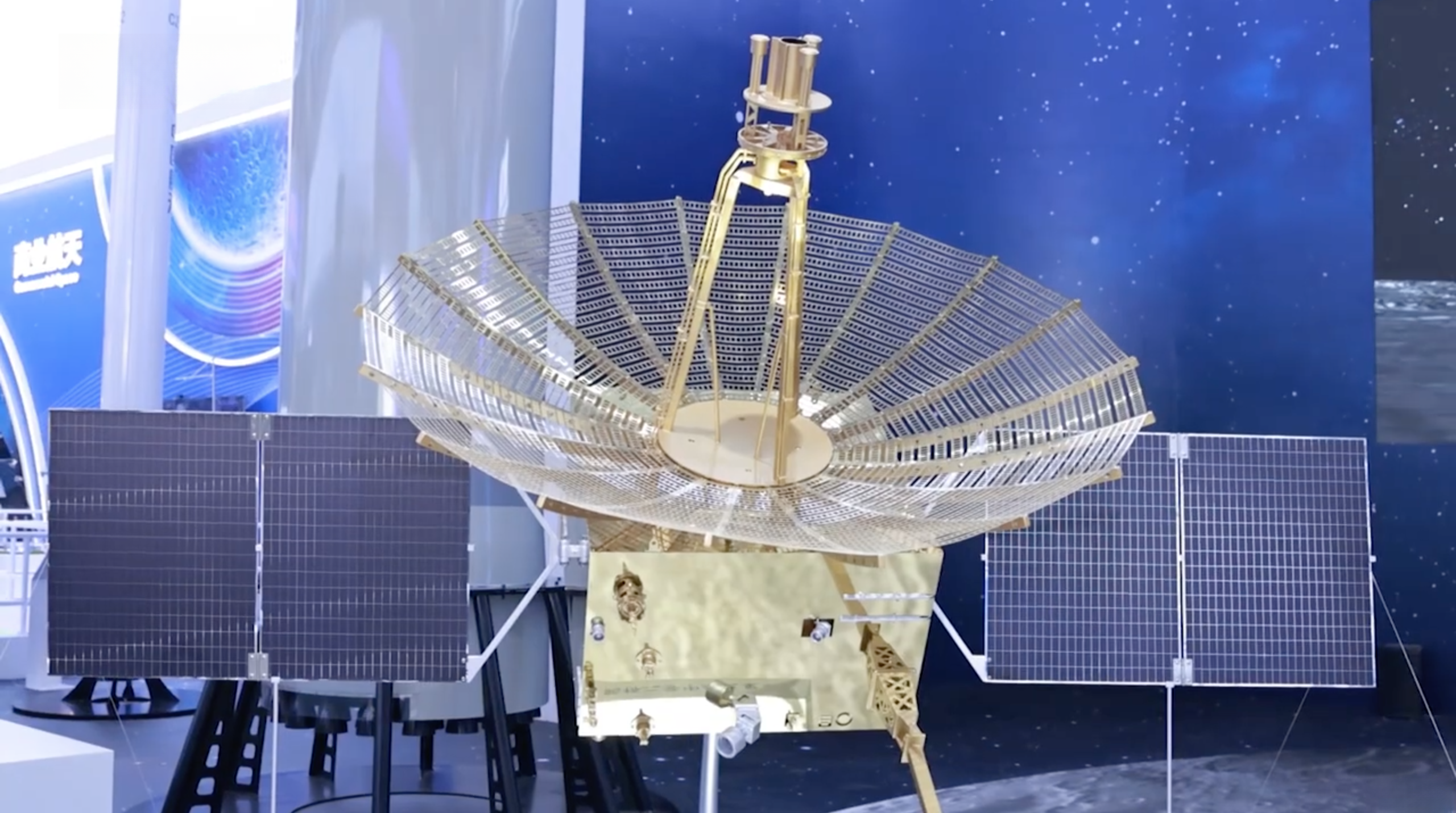
Queqiao-2 mockup model

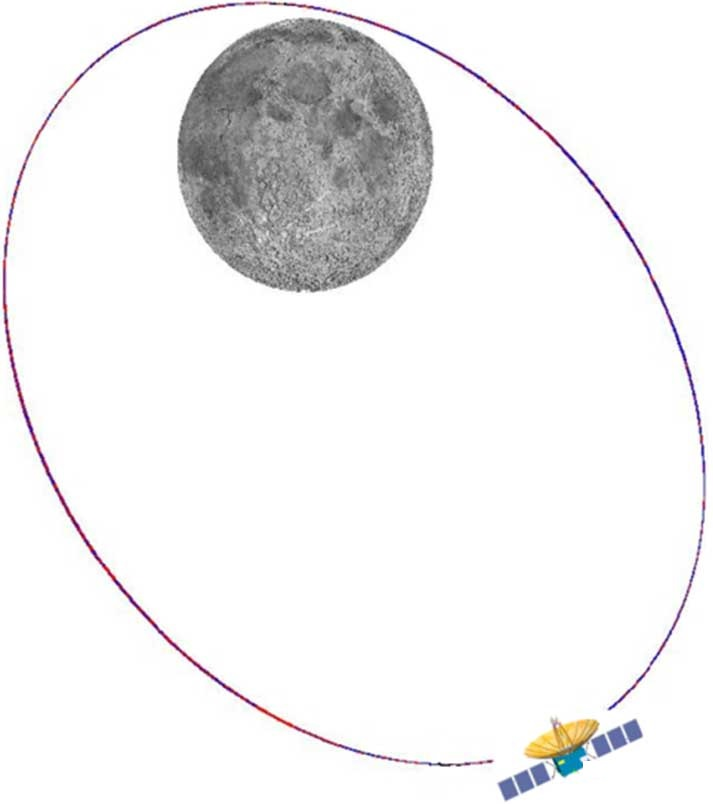
Orbital regime of Queqiao-2 satellite

Queqiao 2 relay satellite and radio observatory is based on the CAST 2000 bus from DFH Satellite, a subsidiary of the Chinese Academy of Space Technology. It carries a total of 488 kg (1,076 lb) of hydrazine and oxidizer in tanks with a total capacity of 606 L (133 imp gal; 160 US gal), giving it a take-off weight of around 1,200 kg (2,600 lb). The three-axis stabilized satellite has eight engines with a thrust of 20 N each for orbit correction maneuvers as well as eight engines with a thrust of 5 N each and four engines with a thrust of 1 N each for attitude control; it can be aligned with an accuracy of 0.03° (three times as good as the standard version of the satellite bus). Two rotatable solar cell wings, each with two solar arrays, deliver a total output of 1350 W, the operating voltage is 30.5 V. During blackoutor eclipse period, it has accumulators with a charge storage capacity of 135 Ah. The manufacturing company assumes that Queqiao 2 will work properly for at least 8 to 10 years.

Adopted from the first Queqiao, a parabolic antenna with a diameter of 4.2 m and an antenna gain of 44 dBi is permanently mounted on the top of the bus- the alignment is carried out via the satellite's attitude control - and is used for radio communication with the lunar surface. In order to be able to accommodate the satellite in the payload fairing of the launch vehicle, the segments of the reflector are folded together during launch. After separating from the upper stage of the rocket and unfolding the solar modules, the antenna is also unfolded at the beginning of the transfer orbit to the Moon.

Communication with the lunar surface is accomplished in the X band, using a high-gain 4.2 metres (14 ft) deployable parabolic antenna, the largest antenna used for a deep space exploration satellite.

The large parabolic antenna provides 10 simultaneously usable X-band channels for radio traffic down to the Moon and 10 channels for traffic up to the satellite, as well as the possibility of communicating in the decimeter wave range. In the opposite direction, telemetry and payload data from the robots can be transmitted upwards at a speed of 50 kbit/s when using an omnidirectional antenna, and at 5 Mbit/s when using a parabolic antenna. The signals are then demodulated and decoded in the satellite.

The K_{a} band is used to transmit payload data to the ground stations of the Chinese Academy of Sciences, both from the surface probes on the Moon and from the satellite itself. With quadrature phase shift keying, encryption with low-density parity check code and a traveling wave tube amplifier with 55 W output power, the data transfer rate is on average 100 Mbit/s. The antenna used is a small parabolic antenna with a diameter of 0.6 m in a gimbal suspension, which is mounted on the nadir side of the satellite bus on a fold-out arm that allows it to protrude above the large parabolic antenna.

Telemetry and control of the satellite is usually carried out on the S-band, for which there is an S-band omnidirectional antenna at the focal point of the small parabolic antenna in addition to the K_{a} band transceiver. The data transmission rate for commands from the Earth to the satellite is 2000 bit/s, the telemetry data is transmitted from the satellite to the Earth at a speed of 4096 bit/s. This is twice as fast as the first Queqiao. The position is determined using a combination of the so-called Unified S-Band Technology (USB), where the distance and speed of the satellite are calculated from the Doppler shift of the carrier wave for the telemetry signals, and long-base interferometry, where connected radio telescopes are using the Chinese VLBI network to determine the exact angular position.

The systems are alternately redundant. In the event of a failure of the S-band system, the telemetry and control signals can also be transmitted via the K_{a} band, and if the K_{a} band signals are subject to strong attenuation by the water droplets in the Earth's atmosphere during the hot and wet season, the payload data can also be transmitted via the S-band, but only with a data transfer rate of a maximum of 6 Mbit/s. Similar to a satellite navigation system, the time of arrival, i.e., a transit time measurement of the signals between the partners involved in communication, is used to determine their position in orbit or on the surface of the Moon with high accuracy.

== Scientific payloads ==
There are three scientific payloads on the spacecraft:

- Grid-based Energetic Neutral Atom imager (GENA): Images particle detector for neutral atoms for observing the terrestrial magnetosphere, especially the magnetotail.
- Extreme Ultraviolet Camera (EUC).
- Lunar Orbit VLBI EXperiment: The intention is to use the 4.2 m antenna as a radio telescope during the four hours the satellite spends over the Moon's north pole during each orbit. The satellite will be used in conjunction with terrestrial telescopes for long-base interferometry with a baseline of 400,000 km. The aim is not only to determine the position and composition of radio sources outside the Milky Way, but also as part of the Chinese deep space network, i.e., the position of spacecraft such as the asteroid probe Tianwen-2. For use as a radio telescope, a cooled X-band receiver for the frequency range 8–9 GHz with a noise temperature of less than 50 K and four selectable bandwidths (64, 128, 256 and 512 MHz) is mounted on the antenna. In order to be able to accurately determine the transit time difference between the satellite and the terrestrial radio telescope for a given signal and thus calculate the position of the radio source or the spacecraft (the position of the satellite itself can be determined with an accuracy of 30 m), the satellite has an atomic clock with a maximum deviation of 10 −12 per second or 10 −14 per day. The receiver and clock together have a mass of 45 kg (99 lb) and have an average power consumption of 220 W.

== Mission ==
Queqiao-2 was launched on 20 March 2024 at 00:31 UTC by a Long March 8 rocket from the Wenchang Space Launch Site, supporting China's Chang'e 6 in 2024 and future 7 and 8 lunar missions scheduled for 2026 and 2028 respectively. The upgraded Queqiao-2 entered lunar orbit on 24 March 2024 at 16:46 UTC, where it is expected to operate for 8–10 years and by using an elliptical frozen orbit of 200 km × 16,000 km with an inclination of 62.4°, instead of the L_{2} halo orbit.

The initial mission of Queqiao-2 is to provide relay communication support for Chang'e 6. After Chang'e 6 completed its mission, it adjusted its orbit to provide services for Chang'e-7, Chang'e-8 and subsequent lunar exploration missions. In the future, Queqiao-2 will also work with Chang'e 7 and Chang'e 8 to build the International Lunar Research Station.

Queqiao-2 also carries two smaller Deep Space Exploration Laboratory communication satellites, Tiandu-1 and Tiandu-2, as technology demonstrators of a constellation of lunar communication and navigation satellites. After launch, the two Tiandu satellites underwent lunar orbit insertion on 24 March 2024 at 17:43 UTC and entered a large elliptical orbit around the Moon (Both were attached to each other and separated in lunar orbit on 3 April 2024). Both are equipped with a communications payload and first one has a laser passive retroreflector and an in-space router, with another has navigational devices. In a large elliptical orbit around the moon, satellite-to-ground laser ranging are inter-satellite microwave ranging are to be carried out by these satellites via high-precision lunar orbit determination technology.

On 12 April 2024, CNSA announced that Queqiao-2 had successfully completed in-orbit communication tests with Chang'e 4 on the far side of the moon and the Chang'e 6 probe while still on the ground. The satellite entered its targeted elliptical orbit on 2 April after a correction midway, near-moon braking and orbital manoeuvre around the moon. It facilitates communication between Earth and lunar probes signaling China's commitment to space exploration and international cooperation.

On 23 September 2024, it was discovered by independent astronomer Scott Tilley that the satellite was instead in a 119.25° 1992 × 18679 km retrograde orbit.

== Comparison of relay satellites ==
Here is a comparison of some of the key differences of the two lunar relay satellites:

	Queqiao	Queqiao 2
Bus	CAST 100	CAST 2000
Mass	449 kg (990 lb)	1,200 kg (2,600 lb)
Power Supply	4 solar panels, total 800 W	4 solar panels, total 1350 W
Accumulator	45 Ah	135 Ah
Orbit	Earth-Moon L_{2} Halo orbit at 65,000 km from Moon	Retrograde elliptical orbit around Moon of 1992 × 18679 km at 119.25°
orbital period	14 days	26.18 hours
Line of sight of surface probes	always	
No. of surface probes monitored	2	10
Antenna	X-band parabolic antenna 4.2 m S-band spiral antenna	X-band parabolic antenna 4.2 m 4 S-band omni-directional antennas UHF omni-directional antenna K_{a}-band parabolic antenna 0.6 m
Satellite to lunar surface probes communication	X-Band 125 bit/s	X-Band 1 kbit/s
Satellite to lunar surface probes communication	X-Band 555 kbit/s	X-Band 5 Mbit/s
Satellite to and fro Earth communication	S-Band 4 Mbit/s	K_{a}-Band 100 Mbit/s
Start of operation	2018	2024
End of operation	2026 (expected)	2034 (expected)

== See also ==
- Queqiao-1
- Chang'e 6
- Qianfan
