= Tiandu =

Chinese space satellites

- Mission type: Technology demonstration
- Operator: Deep Space Exploration Laboratory; CNSA
- Mission duration: 2 years, 7 months, 26 days (in progress)

Spacecraft properties
- Spacecraft: Tiandu
- Manufacturer: Deep Space Exploration Laboratory

Start of mission
- Launch date: 20 March 2024, 00:31 UTC
- Rocket: Long March 8
- Launch site: Wenchang Space Launch Site LC-2

Orbital parameters
- Reference system: Selenocentric elliptic orbit

Lunar orbiter
- Orbital insertion: 24 March 2024, 17:43 UTC

Tiandu satellites are a pair of Chinese Lunar Exploration Program's lunar navigation and communications test satellites based on Queqiao-2 relay satellite technology.

== Design and development ==
Tiandu satellites will perform navigation and communications technology verification experiments while flying in formation in lunar orbit. Satellite-to-ground laser ranging as well as intersatellite microwave ranging techniques will also be tested.

The Tiandu satellites' mission is to inform the design of China's proposed Queqiao lunar navigation and communication array. Supporting services for lunar surface operations would be provided by such system. Line-of-sight communications limits affect uncrewed and crewed operations on the Moon, especially at the lunar south pole, an area of great interest, or the lunar far side.

The 61 kg (134 lb) Tiandu-1 carries a K_{a} dual-band integrated communication payload, a laser retroreflector, a space router and other payloads. The 15 kg (33 lb) Tiandu-2 carries a communication payload and navigation devices.

== Mission ==
The mission was launched together as a single probe with Queqiao 2 in 2024 on a Long March 8 rocket.

After launch, the two satellites (while being attached to each other) underwent lunar orbit insertion on 24 March 2024 at 17:43 UTC and entered a large elliptical orbit around the Moon. In that large elliptical orbit around the Moon, they separated on 3 April 2024 and later satellite-to-ground laser ranging are inter-satellite microwave ranging are to be carried out by these satellites via high-precision lunar orbit determination technology.

Tiandu-1 and Tiandu-2 reached their target circumlunar orbits on 29 March 2024 and separated on 3 April. On 8 April, Tiandu-1 began flying in formation with Tiandu-2 at a distance of about 200 km, and the two satellites operated with normal communication, stable attitude and energy balance. Queqiao-2 and both Tiandu satellites use a highly elliptical lunar frozen orbit, which is stable and keeps trajectory deviation to a minimum. According to Science and Technology Daily, the satellites successfully carried out experiments on highly reliable Earth–Moon transmission and routing. Telemetry data showed that the tests could effectively improve the accuracy of lunar orbit determination, and Tiandu-2 captured and sent back images of the Earth and Moon together.
