= Comparison of communication satellite operators =

The following is a list of the world's largest fixed service satellite operators in the world. Comparison data is from different time periods and sources and may not be directly comparable.

| Name of the Operator | 2019 Revenue | 2018 Revenue | 2017 Revenue | 2014 Revenue | 2010 Revenue | 2009 Revenue | 2008 Revenue | 2007 Revenue | 2006 Revenue | Country | Satellites in Orbit | Satellites on Order |
|---|---|---|---|---|---|---|---|---|---|---|---|---|
| SES | €1.983 billion | €2.010 billion | €2.035 billion | €1.919 billion | €1.736 billion | €1.620 billion | €1.521 billion | €1.611 billion | €1.617 billion | Luxembourg | 52 | 6 |
| Viasat, Inc. | $2.068 billion | $1.667 billion | $1.56 billion | $1.351 billion | $688.1 million | $628.2 million | $574.7 million | $516.6 million | $433.8 million | United States | 4 | 1 |
| Intelsat | $2.061 billion | $2.161 billion | $2.603 billion | $2.472 billion | $2.545 billion | $2.513 billion | $2.364 billion | $2.183 billion | $1.663 billion | Luxembourg / United States | 59 | 8 |
| Eutelsat | $1.321 billion | $1.391 billion | $1.408 billion | €1.476 billion (10–11) | €1.170 billion (10–11) | €1.050 billion (09-10) | €940.0 million (08-09) | $1.240 billion | $1.050 billion | France | 37 | 6 |
| Inmarsat | | $1.465 billion | $1.392 billion | $1.285 billion | $1.171 billion | $1.038 billion | $996.7 million | $576.5 million | $500.1 million | United Kingdom | 13 | 7 |
| Telesat Canada | | | | $923 million | | $787.0 million | $711.0 million | $684.7 million | $575.0 million | Canada | 13 | 3 |
| SKY Perfect JSAT Group/JSAT Corporation | | | | | | | | $347.4 million | $326.0 million | Japan | 8 | 3 |
| Star One | | | | | | | | $207.4 million | $195.8 million | Brazil | 7 | 0 |
| Hispasat | | | | | | | | $188.6 million | $159.1 million | Spain | 11 | 0 |
| SingTel/Optus | | | | | | | | $172.2 million | $158.4 million | Singapore | 5 | 1 |
| Russian Satellite Communications | | | | | | | | $161 million | $152 million | Russia | 11 | 3 |
| Space communications | | | | | | | | $151.4 million | $151.2 million | Japan | 4 | 1 |
| Arabsat | | | | | | | | $150 million | $150 million | Saudi Arabia | 6 | 1 |
| Telenor Satellite Broadcasting | | | | | | | | $140.8 million | $106.5 million | Norway | 4 | 1 |
| Thaicom/formerly Shin Satellite | | | | | | | | $133.7 million | $122.3 million | Thailand | 5 | 0 |
| AsiaSat | | | | | | | | $120.4 million | $119.6 million | Hong Kong | 3 | 1 |
| Indian Space Research Organisation/Antrix | | | | | | | | $120 million | $76 million | India | 11 | 6 |
| Korea Telecom | | | | | | | | $110.1 million | $119.6 million | South Korea | 3 | 1 |
| Nilesat | | | | | | | | $91.6 million | $79.8 million | Egypt | 2 | 1 |
| Satmex | | | | | | | | $80.25 million | $79 million | Mexico | 2 | 1 |
| Gascom | | | | | | | | $69.8 million | $47.1 million | Russia | 3 | 2 |
| SES Sirius | | | | | | | | $69.4 million | $58.7 million | Sweden | 2 | 0 |
| Broadcast Satellite System | | | | | | | | $66.3 million | $60.8 million | Japan | 3 | 1 |
| APT Satellite | | | | | | | | $57.9 million | $54.9 million | Hong Kong | 6 | 0 |
| MEASAT Satellite Systems | | | | | | | | $56.5 million | $38.9 million | Malaysia | 3 | 1 |
| Spacecom | | | | | | | | $56 million | $56 million | Israel | 3 | 2 |
| PT Telkom | | | | | | | | $24.9 million | $32.8 million | Indonesia | 2 | 1 |
| EchoStar | | | | | | | | N/A | N/A | United States | 8 | 9 |
| Starlink | | | N/A | N/A | N/A | N/A | N/A | N/A | N/A | United States | 1385 | 4112 (Phase 1); 7518 (Phase 2) |
| OneWeb | | | N/A | N/A | N/A | N/A | N/A | N/A | N/A | United Kingdom | 146 | 650 (Phase 1) |

- Note: Revenue in U.S. Dollars
