= Orbital station-keeping =

Maintenance of a particular orbit

In astrodynamics, orbital station-keeping is keeping a spacecraft at a fixed distance from another spacecraft or celestial body. It requires a series of orbital maneuvers (reboosts) made with thruster burns to keep the active craft in the same orbit as its target. For many low Earth orbit satellites, the effects of non-Keplerian forces, i.e. the deviations of the gravitational force of the Earth from that of a homogeneous sphere, gravitational forces from Sun/Moon, solar radiation pressure and air drag, must be counteracted. For spacecraft in a halo orbit around a Lagrange point, station-keeping is even more fundamental, as such an orbit is unstable; without an active control with thruster burns, the smallest deviation in position or velocity would result in the spacecraft leaving orbit completely.

== Perturbations ==
The deviation of Earth's gravity field from that of a homogeneous sphere and gravitational forces from the Sun and Moon will in general perturb the orbital plane. For a Sun-synchronous orbit, the precession of the orbital plane caused by the oblateness of the Earth is a desirable feature that is part of mission design but the inclination change caused by the gravitational forces of the Sun and Moon is undesirable. For geostationary spacecraft, the inclination change caused by the gravitational forces of the Sun and Moon must be counteracted by a rather large expense of fuel, as the inclination should be kept sufficiently small for the spacecraft to be tracked by non-steerable antennae.

For spacecraft in a low orbit, the effects of atmospheric drag must often be compensated for, often to avoid re-entry; for missions requiring the orbit to be accurately synchronized with the Earth’s rotation, this is necessary to prevent a shortening of the orbital period.

Solar radiation pressure will in general perturb the eccentricity (i.e. the eccentricity vector); see Orbital perturbation analysis (spacecraft). For some missions, this must be actively counter-acted with maneuvers. For geostationary spacecraft, the eccentricity must be kept sufficiently small for a spacecraft to be tracked with a non-steerable antenna. Also for Earth observation spacecraft for which a very repetitive orbit with a fixed ground track is desirable, the eccentricity vector should be kept as fixed as possible. A large part of this compensation can be done by using a frozen orbit design, but often thrusters are needed for fine control maneuvers.

== Low Earth orbit ==
For spacecraft in a very low orbit, the atmospheric drag is sufficiently strong to cause a re-entry before the intended end of mission if orbit raising maneuvers are not executed from time to time.

An example of this is the International Space Station (ISS), which has an operational altitude above Earth's surface of between 400 and 430 km (250-270 mi). Due to atmospheric drag the space station is constantly losing orbital energy. In order to compensate for this loss, which would eventually lead to a re-entry of the station, it has to be reboosted to a higher orbit from time to time. The chosen orbital altitude is a trade-off between the average thrust needed to counter-act the air drag and the impulse needed to send payloads and people to the station.

GOCE which orbited at 255 km (later reduced to 235 km) used ion thrusters to provide up to 20 mN of thrust to compensate for the drag on its frontal area of about 1 m^{2}.

== Earth observation spacecraft ==
For Earth observation spacecraft typically operated in an altitude above the Earth surface of about 700 – 800 km the air-drag is very faint and a re-entry due to air-drag is not a concern. But if the orbital period should be synchronous with the Earth's rotation to maintain a fixed ground track, the faint air-drag at this high altitude must also be counter-acted by orbit raising maneuvers in the form of thruster burns tangential to the orbit. These maneuvers will be very small, typically in the order of a few mm/s of delta-v. If a frozen orbit design is used these very small orbit raising maneuvers are sufficient to also control the eccentricity vector.

To maintain a fixed ground track it is also necessary to make out-of-plane maneuvers to compensate for the inclination change caused by Sun/Moon gravitation. These are executed as thruster burns orthogonal to the orbital plane. For Sun-synchronous spacecraft having a constant geometry relative to the Sun, the inclination change due to the solar gravitation is particularly large; a delta-v in the order of 1–2 m/s per year can be needed to keep the inclination constant.

== Geostationary orbit ==
Inclined orbital planes

For geostationary spacecraft, thruster burns orthogonal to the orbital plane must be executed to compensate for the effect of the lunar/solar gravitation that perturbs the orbit pole with typically 0.85 degrees per year. The delta-v required to compensate for this perturbation and maintain the desired inclination relative to the equatorial plane is approximately 50 m/s per year. This part of the GEO station-keeping is called North-South control.

The East-West control is the control of the orbital period and the eccentricity vector performed by making thruster burns tangential to the orbit. These burns are then designed to keep the orbital period perfectly synchronous with the Earth rotation and to keep the eccentricity sufficiently small. Perturbation of the orbital period results from the imperfect rotational symmetry of the Earth relative the North/South axis, sometimes called the ellipticity of the Earth equator. The eccentricity (i.e. the eccentricity vector) is perturbed by the solar radiation pressure. The fuel needed for this East-West control is much less than what is needed for the North-South control.

To extend the life-time of geostationary spacecraft with little fuel left one sometimes discontinues the North-South control only continuing with the East-West control. As seen from an observer on the rotating Earth the spacecraft will then move North-South with a period of 24 hours. When this North-South movement gets too large a steerable antenna is needed to track the spacecraft. An example of this is Artemis.

To save weight, it is crucial for GEO satellites to have the most fuel-efficient propulsion system. Almost all modern satellites are therefore employing a high specific impulse system like plasma or ion thrusters.

== Lagrange points ==
Orbits of spacecraft are also possible around Lagrange points—also referred to as libration points—five equilibrium points that exist in relation to two larger solar system bodies. For example, there are five of these points in the Sun-Earth system, five in the Earth-Moon system, and so on. Spacecraft may orbit around these points with a minimum of propellant required for station-keeping purposes. Two orbits that have been used for such purposes include halo and Lissajous orbits.

One important Lagrange point is Earth-Sun L_{1}, and three heliophysics missions have been orbiting L1 since approximately 2000. Station-keeping propellant use can be quite low, facilitating missions that can potentially last decades should other spacecraft systems remain operational. The three spacecraft—Advanced Composition Explorer (ACE), Solar Heliospheric Observatory (SOHO), and the Global Geoscience WIND satellite—each have annual station-keeping propellant requirements of approximately 1 m/s or less. Earth-Sun L_{2}—approximately 1.5 million kilometers from Earth in the anti-sun direction—is another important Lagrange point, and the ESA Herschel space observatory operated there in a Lissajous orbit during 2009–2013, at which time it ran out of coolant for the space telescope. Small station-keeping orbital maneuvers were executed approximately monthly to maintain the spacecraft in the station-keeping orbit.

The James Webb Space Telescope will use propellant to maintain its halo orbit around the Earth-Sun L2, which provides an upper limit to its designed lifetime: it is being designed to carry enough for ten years. However, the precision of trajectory following launch by an Ariane 5 is credited with potentially doubling the lifetime of the telescope by leaving more hydrazine propellant on-board than expected.

The CAPSTONE orbiter and the planned Lunar Gateway is stationed along a 9:2 synodically resonant Near Rectilinear Halo Orbit (NRHO) around the Earth-Moon L2 Lagrange point.

== See also ==
- Delta-v budget
- Orbital perturbation analysis
- Reboost
- Teleoperator Retrieval System (robotic device for attaching to another spacecraft and boosting or changing its orbit)
