= Halo orbit =

Periodic, three-dimensional orbit

Halo orbit

Polar view

Equatorial view

SOHO's trajectory, a halo orbit around the Sun-Earth L_{1} point
Earth · SOHO

Polar view of the Sun-Earth Lagrange points. Halo orbits orbit L_{1}, L_{2}, or L_{3} (orbits not shown in diagram).

A halo orbit is a periodic, non-planar orbit associated with one of the L_{1}, L_{2} or L_{3} Lagrange points in the three-body problem of orbital mechanics. Although a Lagrange point is just a point in empty space, its peculiar characteristic is that it can be orbited by a Lissajous orbit or by a halo orbit. These space curves can be thought of as resulting from an interaction between the gravitational pull of the two planetary bodies and the Coriolis and centrifugal force on a spacecraft. Halo orbits exist in any three-body system, e.g., a Sun–Earth–orbiting satellite system or an Earth–Moon–orbiting satellite system. Continuous "families" of both northern and southern halo orbits exist at each Lagrange point. Because halo orbits tend to be unstable, station-keeping using thrusters may be required to keep a satellite on the orbit. Most satellites in halo orbit serve scientific purposes, for example space telescopes.

== Definition and history ==
Robert W. Farquhar first used the name "halo" in 1966 for orbits around L_{2} which were made periodic using thrusters. Farquhar advocated using spacecraft in such an orbit beyond the Moon (Earth–Moon L_{2}) as a communications relay station for an Apollo mission to the far side of the Moon. A spacecraft in such an orbit would be in continuous view of both the Earth and the far side of the Moon, whereas a Lissajous orbit would sometimes make the spacecraft go behind the Moon. In the end, no relay satellite was launched for Apollo, since all landings were on the near side of the Moon.

In 1973 Farquhar and Ahmed Kamel found that when the in-plane amplitude of a Lissajous orbit was large enough there would be a corresponding out-of-plane amplitude that would have the same period, so the orbit ceased to be a Lissajous orbit and became approximately an ellipse. They used analytical expressions to represent these halo orbits; in 1984, Kathleen Howell showed that more precise trajectories could be computed numerically. Additionally, she found that for most values of the ratio between the masses of the two bodies (such as the Earth and the Moon) there was a range of stable orbits.

The first mission to use a halo orbit was ISEE-3, a joint ESA and NASA spacecraft launched in 1978. It traveled to the Sun–Earth L_{1} point and remained there for several years. The next mission to use a halo orbit was Solar and Heliospheric Observatory (SOHO), also a joint ESA/NASA mission to study the Sun, which arrived at Sun–Earth L_{1} in 1996. It used an orbit similar to ISEE-3. Although several other missions since then have traveled to Lagrange points, they (eg. Gaia astrometric space observatory) typically have used the related non-periodic variations called Lissajous orbits rather than an actual halo orbit.

Although halo orbits were well known in the RTBP (Restricted Three Body Problem), it was difficult to obtain Halo orbits for the real Earth-Moon system. Translunar halo orbits were first computed in 1998 by M.A. Andreu, who introduced a new model for the motion of a spacecraft in the Earth-Moon-Sun system, which was called Quasi-Bicircular Problem (QBCP).

In May 2018, Farquhar's original idea was finally realized when China placed the first communications relay satellite, Queqiao, into a halo orbit around the Earth-Moon L_{2} point. On 3 January 2019, the Chang'e 4 spacecraft landed in the Von Kármán crater on the far side of the Moon, using the Queqiao relay satellite to communicate with the Earth.

The James Webb Space Telescope entered a halo orbit around the Sun-Earth L_{2} point on 24 January 2022. Euclid entered a similar orbit around this point in August 2023.

India's space agency ISRO launched Aditya-L1 to study the Sun from a halo orbit around the Sun-Earth L_{1} point. On 6 January 2024, the spacecraft, India's first solar mission, successfully entered a halo orbit with a period of approximately 178 days, at a distance of approximately 1.5 million kilometers from Earth.

== See also ==
- Interplanetary Transport Network – Low-energy trajectories in the Solar System
- Interplanetary spaceflight – Crewed or uncrewed travel between stars or planets
- Lissajous orbit – Quasi-periodic orbital trajectory, another Lagrangian-point orbit which generalizes halo orbits.
- Near-rectilinear halo orbit – Periodic, three-dimensional orbit
- Category:Spacecraft using halo orbits
- Libration point orbit – Quasiperiodic orbit around a Lagrange point
