= Queqiao-1 =

Chinese lunar communications satellite

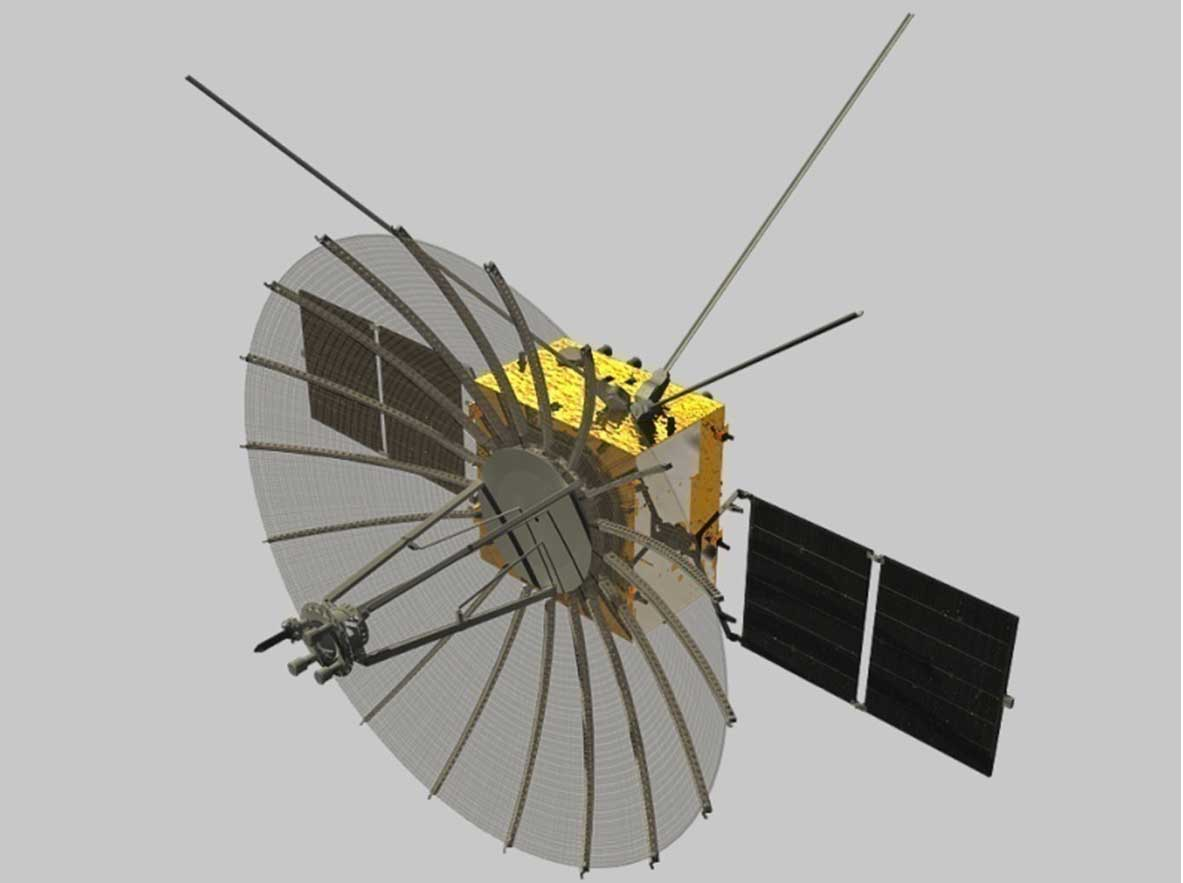
- Rendering of Queqiao satellite
- Mission type: Communication relay Radio astronomy
- Operator: CNSA
- COSPAR ID: 2018-045A
- SATCAT no.: 43470
- Mission duration: Planned: 5 years 8 years, 11 days (in progress)

Spacecraft properties
- Bus: CAST100
- Manufacturer: DFH Satellite Company LTD
- Launch mass: 448.7 kilograms (989 lb)
- Dry mass: 325 kilograms (717 lb)
- Dimensions: Satellite: 1.4 × 1.4 × 0.85 m Antenna: 4.2 metres (14 ft) in diameter
- Power: 800W

Start of mission
- Launch date: 20 May 2018 21:28 UTC
- Rocket: Long March 4C
- Launch site: Xichang LC-3

Orbital parameters
- Reference system: Halo orbit

Earth-Moon L_{2} point orbiter
- Orbital insertion: 14 June 2018

Queqiao relay satellite (Chinese: 鹊桥号中继卫星; pinyin: Quèqiáo hào zhōngjì wèixīng; lit. 'Magpie Bridge relay satellite'), was the first of the pair of communications relay and radio astronomy satellites for the Chinese Lunar Exploration Program. The China National Space Administration (CNSA) launched the Queqiao relay satellite on 20 May 2018 to a halo orbit around the Earth–Moon L_{2} Lagrangian point Queqiao is the first communication relay and radio astronomy satellite at this location.

The name Queqiao ("Magpie Bridge") was inspired by and came from the Chinese tale The Cowherd and the Weaver Girl.

== Design and development ==
Earth-Moon Lagrangian points: A satellite in a halo orbit around L_{2}, which is behind the Moon, will have a view of both the Earth and the Moon's far side

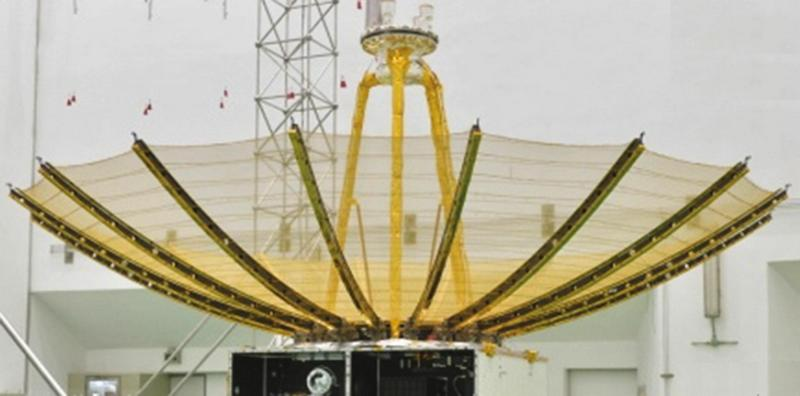
Relay communication antenna with 4.2 m aperture on Queqiao

Queqiao was designed to function as a communication relay for the Chang'e 4 mission to the far side of the Moon, as well as a deep space radio astronomy observatory for the Chinese space program.

Direct communication with Earth is impossible on the far side of the Moon, since transmissions are blocked by the Moon. Communications must go through a communications relay satellite, which is placed at a location that has a clear view of both the landing site and the Earth. A circular orbit, while easy to achieve, would periodically carry the satellite out of sight of either the lander or the Earth. A constellation of multiple satellites can solve this problem at the cost of greater expense and risk. With this in mind, placing a satellite in orbit not around the Moon itself, but around an equilibrium point of the Earth-Moon system on the far side of the Moon (L_{2}) becomes an attractive option.

The types of orbits near the equilibrium points, include Lyapunov orbits, halo orbits, Lissajous orbits, and quasi-halo orbits. Lyapunov orbits pass behind the Moon, restricting communication opportunities with Earth for long periods of time, and as such were not considered. Lissajous orbits require less stationkeeping than halo orbits, but suffer from occasionally passing behind the Moon as well. Their non-periodicity–a trait shared with quasi-halo orbits–further complicates maintaining the pointing of antennas and solar arrays. Thus a halo orbit was chosen, at the cost of greater stationkeeping expense.

An L_{2} halo orbit as a communications relay for an Apollo mission to the far side of the Moon was first suggested in 1966 by Robert W. Farquhar. In the end, no relay satellite was launched for Apollo. Although a number of spacecraft have operated in halo orbits in the Earth-Sun system since then, China was the first to realize Farquhar's original idea of a communications relay satellite in a halo orbit around the Earth-Moon L_{2} point.

The satellite is based on the Chang'e 2 design. It utilizes the CAST100 small satellite bus with an aluminum honeycomb sandwich plate structure, and several 3D-printed parts.

Communication with the lunar surface is accomplished in the X band, using a high-gain 4.2 metres (14 ft) deployable parabolic antenna, the largest antenna used for a deep space exploration satellite. The lunar link uses PCM/PSK/PM modulation in the forward link and BPSK in the backward link. The forward link data rate of the lander and the rover is 125 bit/s. The return link data rate is up to 555 kbit/s for the lander and up to 285 kbit/s for the rover. Data transmission to the Earth operates in the S band in BPSK modulation mode, using a single mid-gain helix antenna at a data rate of up to 10 Mbit/s.

== Mission ==
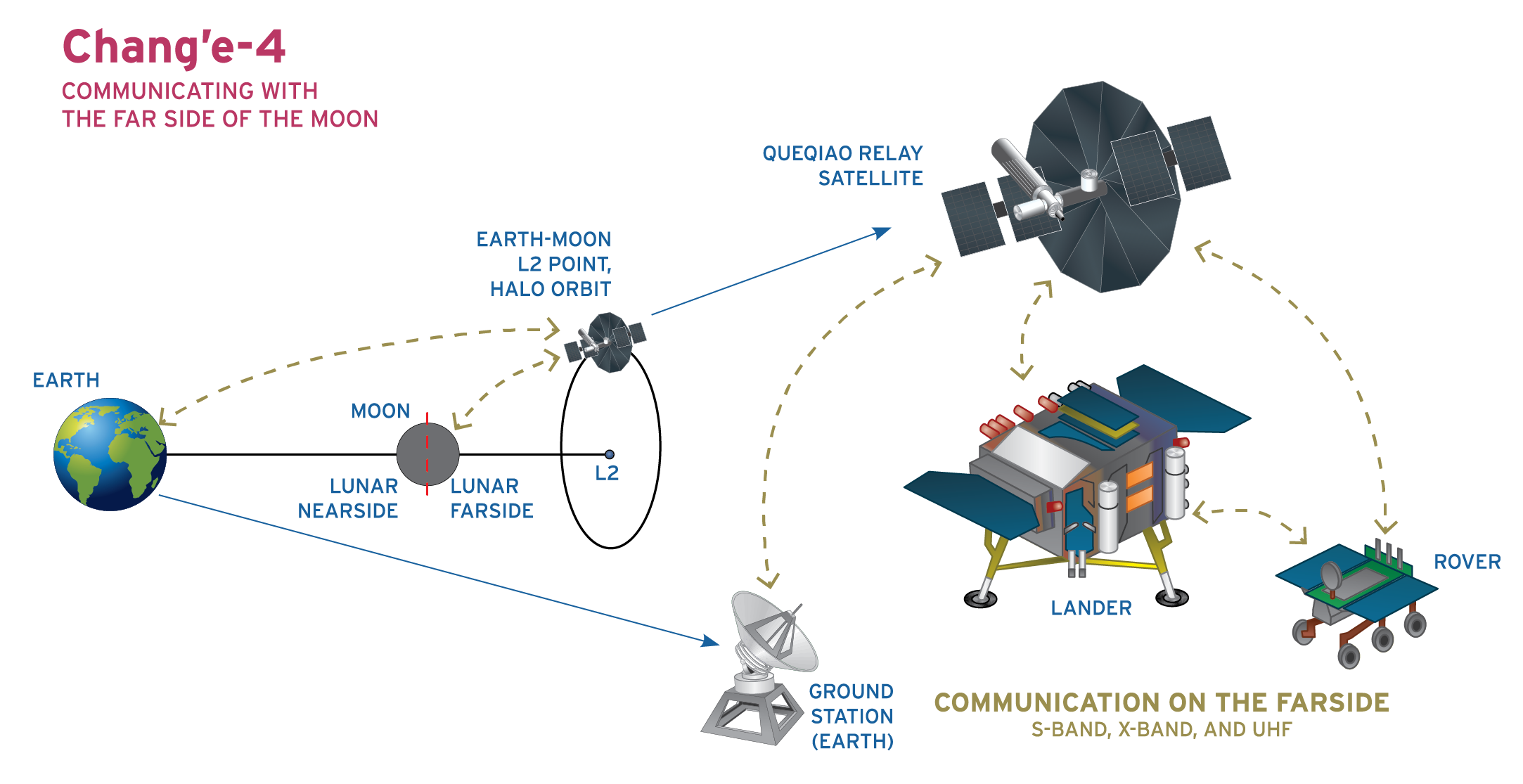
Communication with Chang'e-4 on the Moon's far side

On 20 May 2018, several months before the Chang'e 4 mission, the Queqiao was launched from Xichang Satellite Launch Center in China, on a Long March 4C rocket. The spacecraft took 24 days to reach L_{2}, using a gravity assist at the Moon to save propellant. On 14 June 2018, Queqiao finished its final adjustment burn and entered the mission orbit, about 65,000 kilometres (40,000 mi) from the Moon. This is the first lunar relay satellite ever placed in this location.

In addition to its communication relay equipment, Queqiao carries the Netherlands-China Low Frequency Explorer (NCLE), a radio-astronomy experiment to detect faint radio signals from the early universe. The instrument is intended to perform a wide range of observations in the low-frequency radio regime, such as studying space weather and characterizing the radio background environment at L_{2}. The far side of the Moon is an ideal environment for radio astronomy, because the Moon can shield instruments from man-made radio frequency interference coming from the Earth. While Queqiao's primary mission will keep the instrument constantly in line of sight of the Earth, and expose it to radio interference from the primary communication relay hardware, the accumulated experience and data from NLCE will serve as a pathfinder for future deep space radio astronomy instruments. NLCE successfully deployed its antennas on 27 November 2019.

Queqiao is additionally fitted with a laser reflector developed by Sun Yat-sen University as a pilot study for the TianQin gravitational-wave observatory project.

A pair of scientific microsatellites, Longjiang-1 and Longjiang-2, has been launched with the Queqiao as a secondary payload. The microsatellites weigh 45 kg each and measure 50x50x40 centimeters. Developed at the Harbin Institute of Technology, the microsatellites were to fly in formation in a 300x3000 km orbit to perform ultra-long-wavelength astronomical interferometry. Contact was lost with Longjiang-1 shortly after trans-lunar injection, but Longjiang-2 successfully entered a 350x13700 km altitude lunar orbit on 25 May. Longjiang-2 was equipped with a micro-optical camera provided by King Abdulaziz City for Science and Technology, returning color images of the Earth and the lunar surface. On 24 January 2019, Longjiang-2 performed an end-of-mission maneuver, lowering its periapsis to 500 km. The orbit gradually decayed due to gravitational perturbations with the microsatellite impacting the far side of the lunar surface at 14:20 UTC, 31 July 2019.

== International collaboration ==
China and Radboud University of Netherland collaborated on the Netherlands-China Low Frequency Explorer (NCLE), a radio-astronomy experiment. China has also agreed to a request from NASA to use the Chang'e 4 probe and Queqiao relay satellite in future U.S. Moon missions.
