= Lunar orbit =

Orbit of an object around the Moon

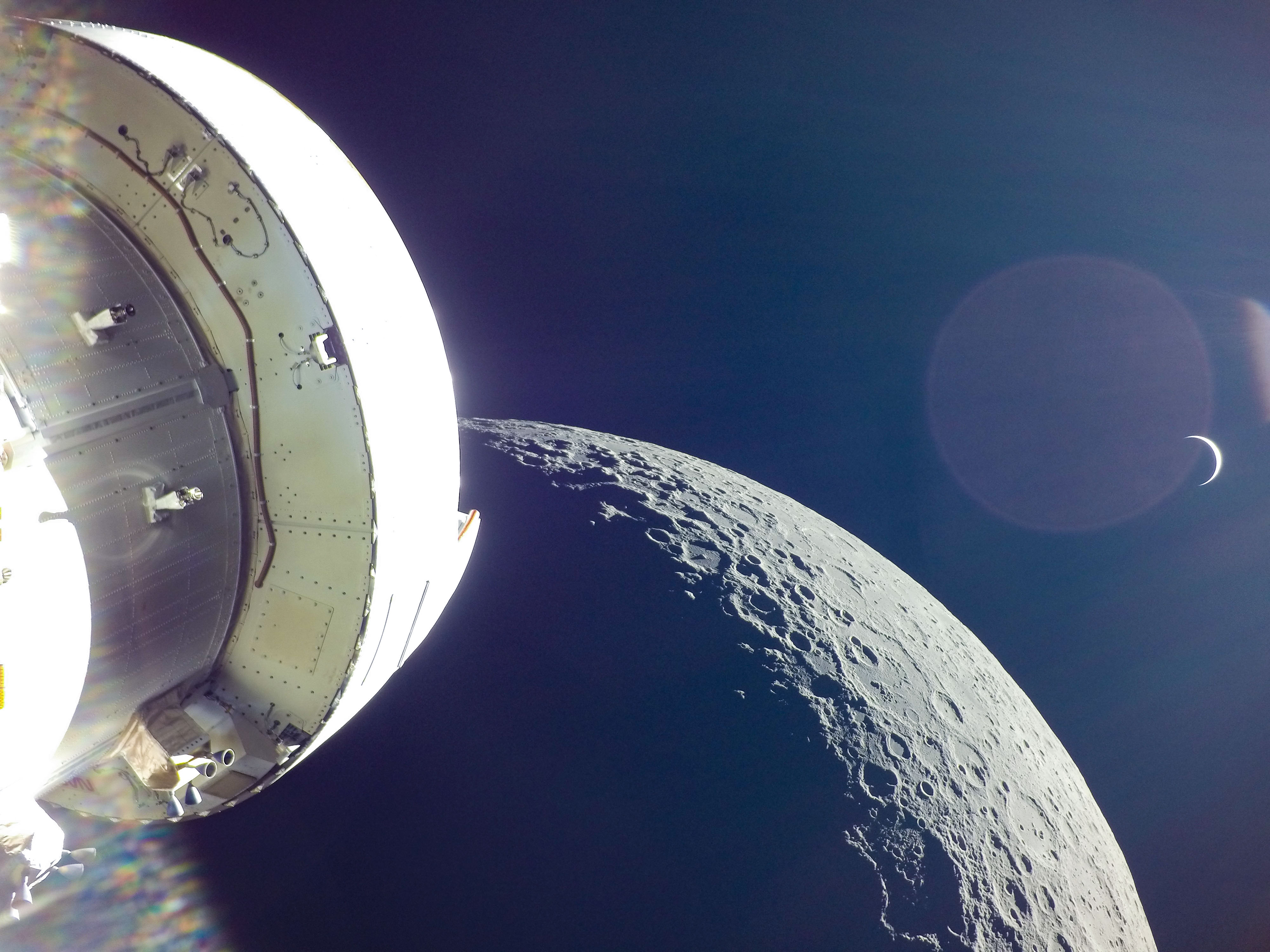
Orion capsule of Artemis 1 above the Moon in December 2022.

In astronomy and spaceflight, a lunar orbit (also known as a selenocentric orbit) is an orbit by an object around Earth's Moon. In general these orbits are not circular. When farthest from the Moon (at apoapsis) a spacecraft is said to be at apolune, apocynthion, or aposelene. When closest to the Moon (at periapsis) it is said to be at perilune, pericynthion, or periselene. These derive from names or epithets of the moon goddess.

Lunar orbit insertion (LOI) is an orbit insertion maneuver used to achieve lunar orbit.

Low lunar orbit (LLO) is an orbit below 100 km (62 mi) altitude. These have a period of about 2 hours. They are of particular interest in the exploration of the Moon, but suffer from gravitational perturbations that make most unstable, and leave only a few orbital trajectories possible for indefinite frozen orbits. These would be useful for long-term stays in LLO.

== Perturbation effects and low orbits ==
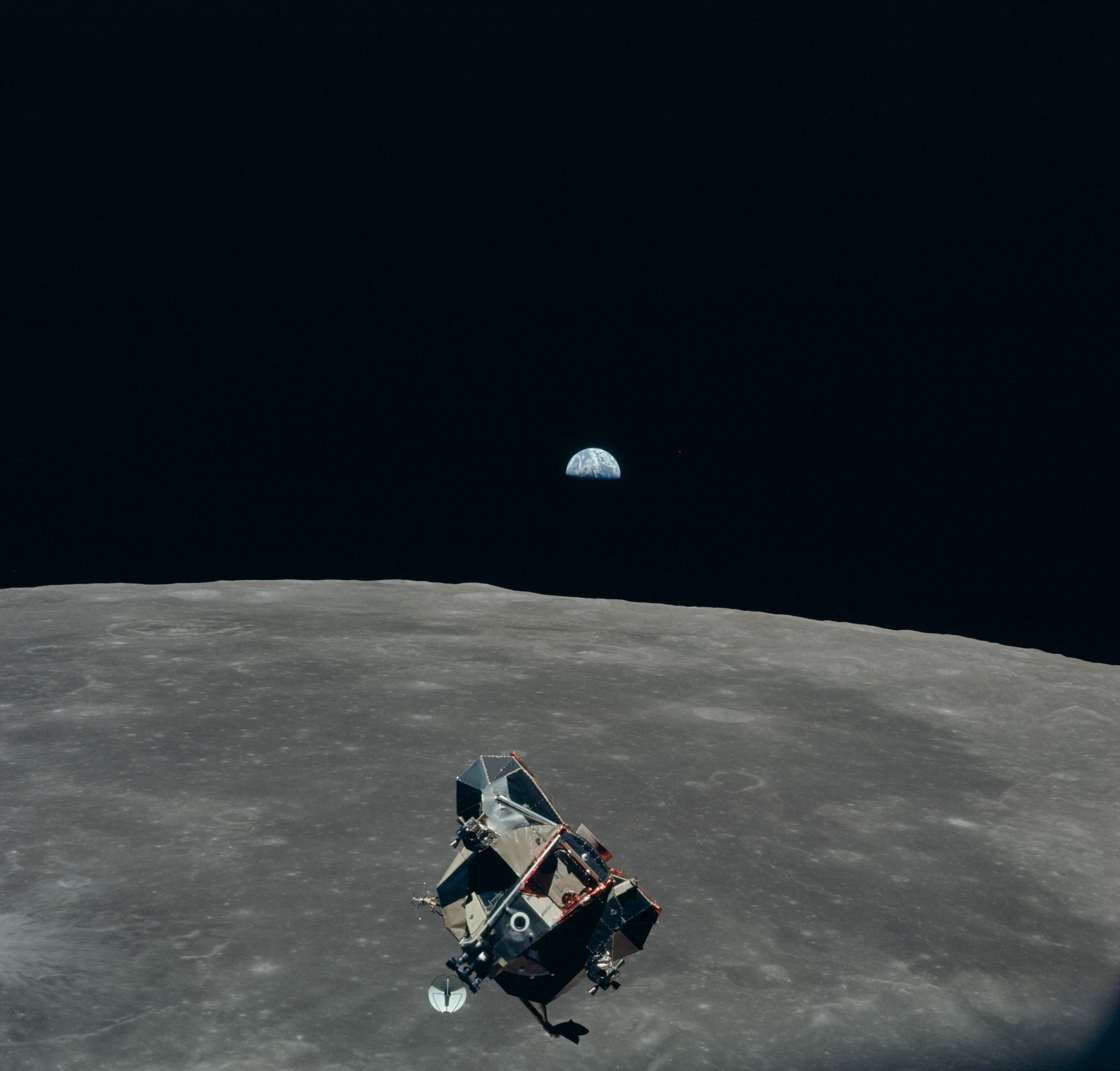
Lunar Module Eagle in lunar orbit during Apollo 11, July 1969

Gravitational anomalies slightly distorting the orbits of some early lunar orbiters led to the discovery in 1968 of mass concentrations (dubbed “mascons”) beneath the lunar surface. These mascons were caused by large bodies which impacted the Moon at some remote time in the past. These anomalies are large enough to cause a plumb bob to hang about a third of a degree off vertical (pointing toward the mascon), and increase the force of gravity by one-half percent. They can cause a lunar orbit to change significantly over the course of several days. This is why most LLO below 100 km (62 mi) are unstable.

In 1969, the first human lunar landing mission employed the first attempt to correct for the perturbation effect. The parking orbit was "circularized" at 66 by 54 nautical miles (122 by 100 km; 76 by 62 mi), which was expected to become the nominal circular 60 nautical miles (110 km; 69 mi) when the lunar module made its return rendezvous with the command module. But the effect was significantly overestimated; at rendezvous, the orbit was calculated to be 63.2 by 56.8 nautical miles (117.0 by 105.2 km; 72.7 by 65.4 mi).

== Stable low orbits ==
Study of the mascons' effect on lunar spacecraft led to the discovery in 2001 of frozen orbits occurring at four orbital inclinations: 27°, 50°, 76°, and 86°, in which a spacecraft can stay in a low orbit indefinitely. The Apollo 15 subsatellite PFS-1 and the Apollo 16 subsatellite PFS-2, both small satellites released from the Apollo Service Module, contributed to this discovery. PFS-1 ended up in a long-lasting orbit, at 28° inclination, and successfully completed its mission after one and a half years. PFS-2 was placed in a particularly unstable orbital inclination of 11°, and lasted only 35 days in orbit before crashing into the lunar surface.

== Lunar high orbits ==
For lunar orbits with altitudes in the 500 to 20,000 km (310 to 12,430 mi) range, the gravity of Earth leads to orbit perturbations. At altitudes higher than that perturbed two-body astrodynamics models are insufficient and three-body models are required.

Although the Moon's Hill sphere extends to a radius of 60,000 km (37,000 mi), the gravity of Earth intervenes enough to make lunar orbits unstable at a distance of 690 km (430 mi).

The Lagrange points of the Earth-Moon system can provide stable orbits in the lunar vicinity, such as halo orbits and distant retrograde orbits.

Some halo orbits remain over particular regions of the lunar surface. These can be used by lunar relay satellites to communicate with surface stations on the far side of the Moon. The first to do this was the 2019 Queqiao relay satellite. It was placed around Earth-Moon L2 at roughly 65,000 km (40,000 mi) from the Moon.

An example of a halo orbit at the second lunar lagrange point.

Since 2022 (CAPSTONE) near-rectilinear halo orbits, using as well a Lagrange point, have been used and are planned to be employed by the Lunar Gateway.

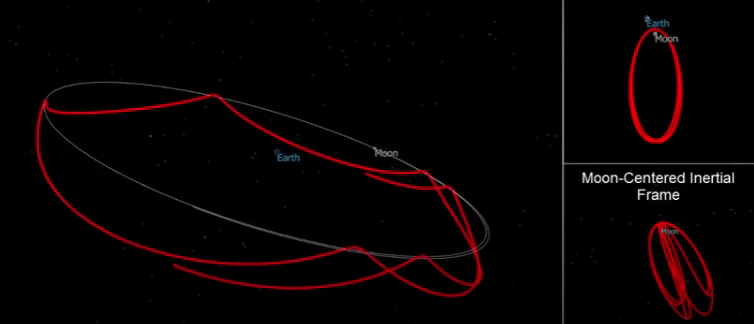
Near-rectilinear halo orbit (NRHO) in cislunar space, as illustrated by A.I. Solutions, Inc. using the FreeFlyer software.

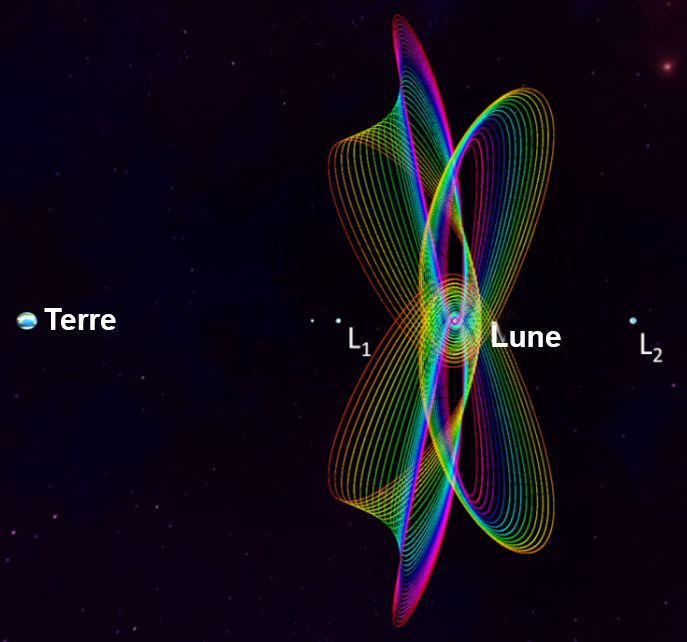
Overview of NRHOs around the Moon

== Orbital transfer ==
There are three main ways to get to lunar orbit from Earth: direct transfer, low thrust transfer, and low-energy transfer. These take 3–4 days, several months, or 2.5–4 months respectively.

Animation of LRO trajectory around Earth. Using a direct transfer, it arrived on moon in four and a half days Lunar Reconnaissance Orbiter · Earth · Moon

Chandrayaan-3's trajectory included multiple orbit raising maneuvers to get to the Moon

SLIM's trajectory included low energy transfer

== History of missions to lunar orbit ==
=== First orbiters ===
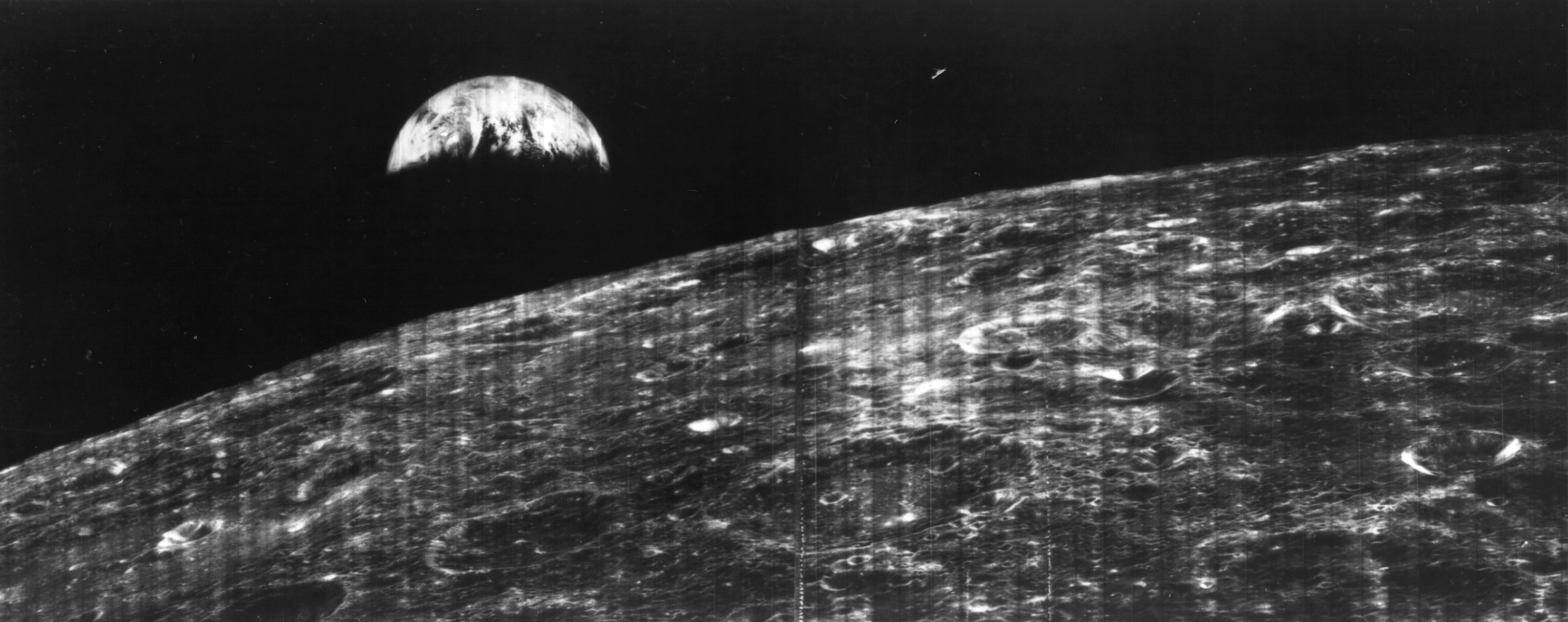
First image of Earth from around another astronomical object (the Moon), and first picture of both Earth and the Moon from space, by Lunar Orbiter 1 (not to be confused with the later Earthrise image).

The Soviet Union sent the first spacecraft to the vicinity of the Moon (or any extraterrestrial object), the robotic vehicle Luna 1, on January 4, 1959. It passed within 6,000 kilometres (3,200 nmi; 3,700 mi) of the Moon's surface, but did not achieve lunar orbit. Luna 3, launched on October 4, 1959, was the first robotic spacecraft to complete a circumlunar free return trajectory, still not a lunar orbit, but a figure-8 trajectory which swung around the far side of the Moon and returned to Earth. This craft provided the first pictures of the far side of the Lunar surface.

Luna 10 became the first spacecraft to actually orbit the Moon and any extraterrestrial body in April 1966. It studied micrometeoroid flux, and lunar environment until May 30, 1966. A follow-on mission, Luna 11, was launched on August 24, 1966, and studied lunar gravitational anomalies, radiation and solar wind measurements.

The first United States spacecraft to orbit the Moon was Lunar Orbiter 1 on August 14, 1966. The first orbit was an elliptical orbit, with an apolune of 1,008 nautical miles (1,867 km; 1,160 mi) and a perilune of 102.1 nautical miles (189.1 km; 117.5 mi). Then the orbit was circularized at around 170 nautical miles (310 km; 200 mi) to obtain suitable imagery. Five such spacecraft were launched over a period of thirteen months, all of which successfully mapped the Moon, primarily for the purpose of finding suitable Apollo program landing sites.

=== Crewed and later orbiters ===
The Apollo program's Command/Service Module (CSM) remained in a lunar parking orbit while the Lunar Module (LM) landed. The combined CSM/LM would first enter an elliptical orbit, nominally 170 by 60 nautical miles (310 by 110 km; 196 by 69 mi), which was then changed to a circular parking orbit of about 60 nautical miles (110 km; 69 mi). Orbital periods vary according to the sum of apoapsis and periapsis, and for the CSM were about two hours. The LM began its landing sequence with a Descent Orbit Insertion (DOI) burn to lower their periapsis to about 50,000 feet (15 km; 8.2 nmi), chosen to avoid hitting lunar mountains reaching heights of 20,000 feet (6.1 km; 3.3 nmi). After the second landing mission, the procedure was changed on Apollo 14 to save more of the LM fuel for its powered descent, by using the CSM's fuel to perform the DOI burn, and later raising its periapsis back to a circular orbit after the LM had made its landing.

== Sun-synchronous lunar orbits ==
A Sun-synchronous lunar orbit is a proposed type of lunar orbit in which the orbital plane remains at nearly the same orientation relative to the Sun over time. To do this, the orbital plane would need to shift by about 1° per day, similar to a sun-synchronous orbit around Earth.

Unlike Earth's sun-synchronous orbits, lunar Sun-synchronous orbits do not occur naturally, because the Lunar gravity field is highly uneven, such an orbit would generally require active control to maintain. Earth and the Sun’s gravity would also affect it through third-body perturbations.

3D concept of Lunar sun-synchronous data centers

== See also ==
- Cislunar space
- Distant retrograde orbit
- List of orbits
- Near-rectilinear halo orbit
- Orbital mechanics
