= Orbit phasing =

Phase Angle
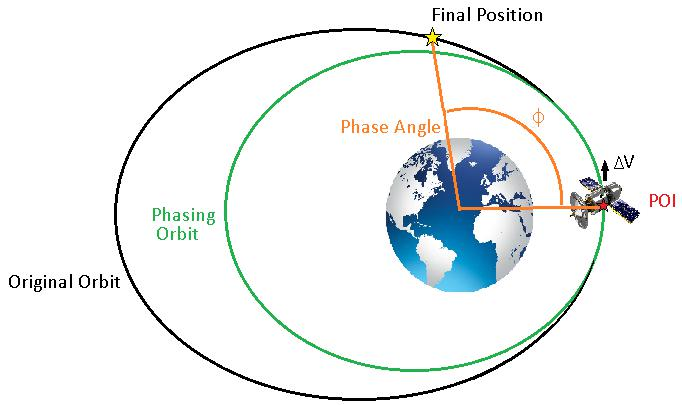

In astrodynamics, orbit phasing is the adjustment of the time-position of spacecraft along its orbit, usually described as adjusting the orbiting spacecraft's true anomaly. Orbital phasing is primarily used in scenarios where a spacecraft in a given orbit must be moved to a different location within the same orbit. The change in position within the orbit is usually defined as the phase angle, ϕ, and is the change in true anomaly required between the spacecraft's current position to the final position.

The phase angle can be converted in terms of time using Kepler's Equation:

$$t = \frac{T_1}{2 \pi} (E-e_1 \sin E)$$
$$E = 2 \arctan \left(\sqrt{\frac{1-e_1}{1+e_1}} \tan{\frac{\phi}{2}}\right)$$
where

- t is defined as time elapsed to cover phase angle in original orbit
- T_{1} is defined as period of original orbit
- E is defined as change of eccentric anomaly between spacecraft and final position
- e_{1} is defined as orbital eccentricity of original orbit
- φ is defined as change in true anomaly between spacecraft and final position

Phase Orbit
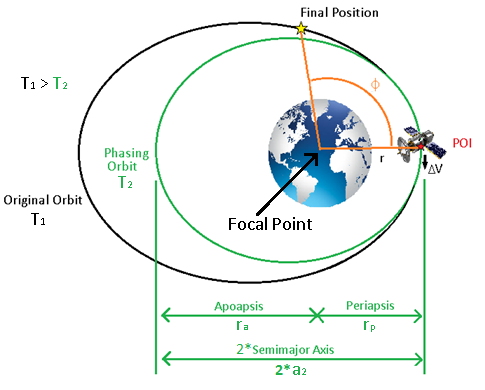
- If spacecraft is behind the final position on the same orbit, the spacecraft must slow down to enter a smaller, faster phasing orbit to catch up to final position.

This time derived from the phase angle is the required time the spacecraft must gain or lose to be located at the final position within the orbit. To gain or lose this time, the spacecraft must be subjected to a simple two-impulse Hohmann transfer which takes the spacecraft away from, and then back to, its original orbit. The first impulse to change the spacecraft's orbit is performed at a specific point in the original orbit (point of impulse, POI), usually performed in the original orbit's periapsis or apoapsis. The impulse creates a new orbit called the “phasing orbit” and is larger or smaller than the original orbit resulting in a different period time than the original orbit. The difference in period time between the original and phasing orbits will be equal to the time converted from the phase angle. Once one period of the phasing orbit is complete, the spacecraft will return to the POI and the spacecraft will once again be subjected to a second impulse, equal and opposite to the first impulse, to return it to the original orbit. When complete, the spacecraft will be in the targeted final position within the original orbit.

To find some of the phasing orbital parameters, first one must find the required period time of the phasing orbit using the following equation.

$$T_2 = T_1 - t$$
where

- T_{1} is defined as period of original orbit
- T_{2} is defined as period of phasing orbit
- t is defined as time elapsed to cover phase angle in original orbit

Once phasing orbit period is determined, the phasing orbit semimajor axis can be derived from the period formula:

$$a_2 = \left(\frac{\sqrt{\mu} T_2}{2 \pi}\right)^{2/3}$$
where

- a_{2} is defined as semimajor axis of phasing orbit
- T_{2} is defined as period of phasing orbit
- μ is defined as Standard gravitational parameter

From the semimajor axis, the phase orbit apogee and perigee can be calculated:
$$2 a_2 = r_a + r_p$$
where

- a_{2} is defined as semimajor axis of phasing orbit
- r_{a} is defined as apogee of phasing orbit
- r_{p} is defined as perigee of phasing orbit

Finally, the phasing orbit's angular momentum can be found from the equation:
$$h_2= \sqrt{2 \mu} \sqrt{\frac{r_a r_p}{r_a+r_p}}$$
where

- h_{2} is defined as angular momentum of phasing orbit
- r_{a} is defined as apogee of phasing orbit
- r_{p} is defined as perigee of phasing orbit
- μ is defined as Standard gravitational parameter

To find the impulse required to change the spacecraft from its original orbit to the phasing orbit, the change of spacecraft velocity, ∆V, at POI must be calculated from the angular momentum formula:
$$\Delta V = v_2 - v_1 = \frac{h_2}{r} - \frac{h_1}{r}$$
where

- ∆V is change in velocity between phasing and original orbits at POI
- v_{1} is defined as the spacecraft velocity at POI in original orbit
- v_{2} is defined as the spacecraft velocity at POI in phasing orbit
- r is defined as radius of spacecraft from the orbit’s focal point to POI
- h_{1} is defined as specific angular momentum of the original orbit
- h_{2} is defined as specific angular momentum of the phasing orbit

Co-orbital Rendezvous
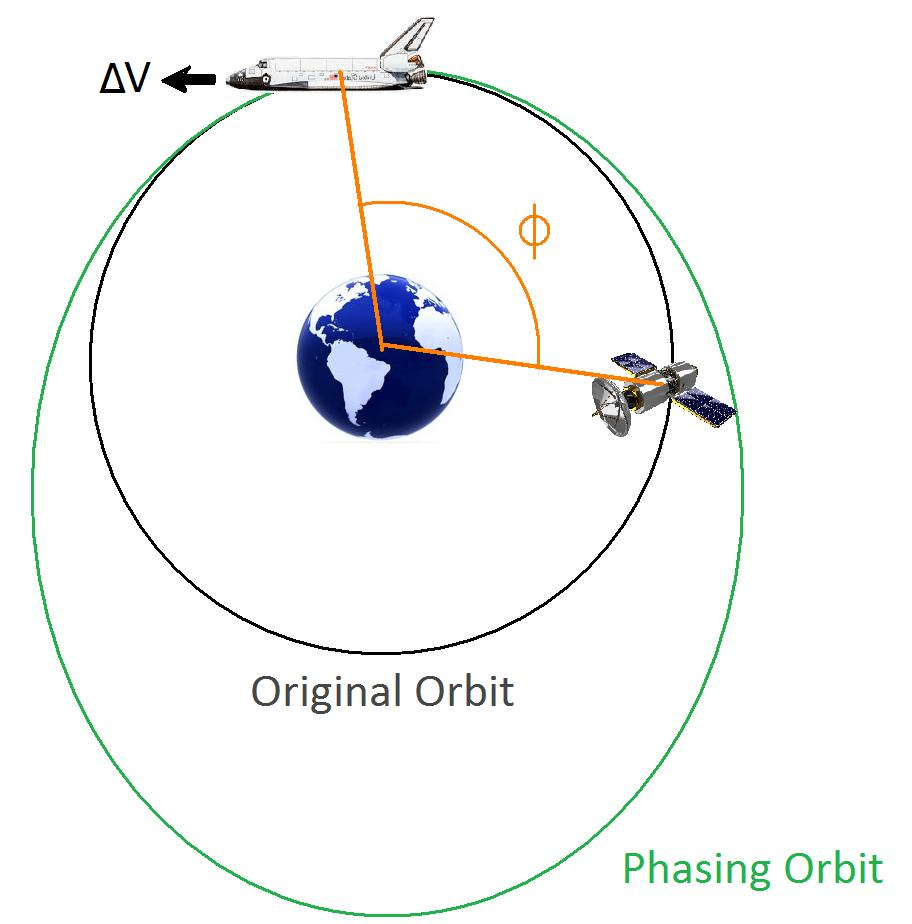
- If the target (satellite) is behind the spacecraft (shuttle) in the same orbit, the spacecraft must speed up to enter a larger, slower phasing orbit to allow the target to catch up.

Remember that this change in velocity, ∆V, is only the amount required to change the spacecraft from its original orbit to the phasing orbit. A second change in velocity equal to the magnitude but opposite in direction of the first must be done after the spacecraft travels one phase orbit period to return the spacecraft from the phasing orbit to the original orbit. Total change of velocity required for the phasing maneuver is equal to two times ∆V.

Orbit phasing can also be referenced as co-orbital rendezvous like a successful approach to a space station in a docking maneuver. Here, two spacecraft on the same orbit but at different true anomalies rendezvous by either one or both of the spacecraft entering phasing orbits which cause them to return to their original orbit at the same true anomaly at the same time.

Phasing maneuvers are also commonly employed by geosynchronous satellites, either to conduct station-keeping maneuvers to maintain their orbit above a specific longitude, or to change longitude altogether.

== See also ==
- Orbital maneuver
- Hohmann transfer orbit
- Clohessy-Wiltshire equations for co-orbit analysis
- Space rendezvous
