= Path-constrained rendezvous =

Moving to a desired orbital position while avoiding obstacles

In spaceflight, a path-constrained rendezvous is the process of moving an orbiting object from its current position to a desired position and velocity, in such a way that no obstacles are contacted along the way. It is a more constrained instance of the general problem of orbital rendezvous.

When no obstacles need consideration, the problem of rendezvous is straightforward, and many efficient algorithms are available to plan the necessary maneuvers. Depending on the desired time taken to accomplish the rendezvous, there are an infinite number of possible rendezvous paths.

The presence of obstacles posing a collision risk complicates the problem. The shortest-time or lowest-energy rendezvous might be made infeasible by obstacles, so a path requiring more time or more energy would have to be employed. For instance, if the purpose is to rescue an astronaut in distress on the far side of a large space station, speed is important. One may have to find quickly the rescue path requiring minimal time to execute, yet avoiding contact with the space station structure.

A natural object of study is the problem of maneuvering in the vicinity of a large orbiting sphere, since a collision with a more complex structure can be avoided by selecting rendezvous paths that avoid contact with a virtual sphere enclosing the structure. Early research considered the problem of departure and arrival points lying on the surface of an orbiting sphere. This led to a pair of necessary conditions called the tangential departure and tangential arrival conditions.

== See also ==
- Space rendezvous

== Selected publications ==
- Stern, S. A. and Soileau, K. M., "Operational Implications for Path-Constrained Rendezvous," Proceedings of the AIAA Guidance, Navigation and Control Conference, Snowmass, CO, August 19–21, 1985, pp. 812–820.
- Soileau, K. M. and Stern, S. A., "Path-Constrained Rendezvous: Necessary and Sufficient Conditions," Journal of Spacecraft and Rockets, Vol. 23, September–October 1986, pp. 492–498.
- Stern, S. A. and Soileau, K. M., "Inadequacy of Single-Impulse Transfers for Path-Constrained Rendezvous," Journal of Spacecraft and Rockets, Vol. 24, May–June 1987, pp. 282–284.
- Soileau, Kerry M., "Defining Optimal Point-to-Point Transfer Surfaces for Orbital Path-Constrained Rendezvous," Proceedings of the AAS/NASA International Symposium, Greenbelt, MD, April 24–27, 1989, pp. 103–107.
- A.J. Grunwald, A. Abramovitz, S.R. Ellis. Interactive method for planning fuel-efficient proximity operations using visual optimization aids. 1995 IEEE International Conference on Systems, Man and Cybernetics. Intelligent Systems for the 21st Century, 2318–2323.
- Der-Ren Taur, Victoria Coverstone-Carroll, John E. Prussing. (1995) Optimal Impulsive Time-Fixed Orbital Rendezvous and Interception with Path Constraints. Journal of Guidance, Control, and Dynamics 18:1, 54-60
- Ismael Lopez, Colin R. McInnes. (1995) Autonomous rendezvous using artificial potential function guidance. Journal of Guidance, Control, and Dynamics 18:2, 237-241
- Russel S. Wenzel, John E. Prussing. (1996) Preliminary study of optimal thrust-limited path-constrained maneuvers. Journal of Guidance, Control, and Dynamics 19:6, 1303-1309
