= Low thrust relative orbital transfer =

In orbital mechanics, low-thrust relative transfer is an orbital maneuver in which a chaser spacecraft covers a specific relative distance relative to the target spacecraft using continuous low-thrust system, typically with a high specific impulse. This is in contrast to conventional impulsive transfers in the orbit which use thermal rocket engines. Such transfers use low-thrust propulsion systems such as electrically powered spacecraft propulsion and solar sails.

Low-thrust relative transfers use the orbital relative motion equations. These are the non-linear equations that describe the motion of the chaser spacecraft relative to the target in terms of displacements along the respective axis of the accelerated frame of reference fixed on the target spacecraft. In 1960, W. H. Clohessy and R. S. Wiltshire published the Clohessy-Wiltshire equations, which present a simplified model of orbital relative motion, in which the target is in a circular orbit, and the chaser spacecraft is in an elliptical or circular orbit. Since the magnitude of the available thrust is limited, the transfer is occasionally posed as an optimal control problem subjected to the required objective and constraints.

== Explanation ==
Relative orbital motion refers to the motion of one spacecraft relative to another spacecraft orbiting the same planet. There can be one primary spacecraft known as the target and the other spacecraft (the chaser) tasked with performing the required maneuver relative to the target. Based on the mission requirements, the various relative orbital transfers can be rendezvous and docking operations, and maintaining station relative to the target. Unlike using a thrust impulse to near-instantaneously change the velocity of the spacecraft, in non-impulsive transfers, there is a continuous application of thrust, so that the spacecraft changes its orbit gradually. Non-impulsive transfers rely on low-thrust propulsion for the operations. Some notable low-thrust propulsion methods are ion propulsion, Hall-effect thrusters, and solar-sail systems.

== Mathematical Models ==
The continuous low-thrust relative transfer can be described in mathematical form by adding components of specific thrust which will act as a control input in the equations of motion model for relative orbital transfer. Although a number of linearized models have been developed since 1960s which gives simplified set of equations, one popular model was developed by W. H. Clohessy and R. S. Wiltshire, and is modified to account for continuous motion and can be written as:

$\ddot{x} = 3n^2x+ 2n\dot{y} + u_x$

$\ddot{y} = -2n\dot{x}+u_y$

$\ddot{z}=-n^2z+u_z$

where:

- $x$, $y$ and $z$ are the relative distance components of the chaser in the target fixed frame of reference
- $u_x, u_y$ and $u_z$ are the specific thrust components in the form of control input along $x$, $y$ and $z$-axis of the target fixed frame of reference
- $n$ is the orbital frequency of the target orbit

=== Optimal relative transfers ===
Since in continuous low-thrust transfers the thrust magnitude is limited, such type of transfers are usually subjected to certain performance index and final state constraints, posing the transfer as an optimal control problem with defined boundary conditions. For the transfer to have optimal control input expenditure, the problem can be written as:

$J = \frac{1}{2}\int_{t_0}^{t_f}(\vec{u}^T \cdot R\cdot \vec{u}) dt$

subjected to dynamics of the relative transfer:

$\dot{\vec{x}} = A\vec{x} + B \vec{u}$

and boundary conditions:

$\vec{x}(t_0) = \vec{x}_0$

$\vec{x}(t_f)=\vec{x}_f$

where:

- $\vec{x}$ is the state-vector defined as
  $$\vec{x} =
\begin{bmatrix}
x & \dot{x} & y & \dot{y} & z & \dot{z}
\end{bmatrix}^T$$
- $\vec{u}$ is the control input vector defined as
  $$\vec{u} =
\begin{bmatrix}
u_x & u_y & u_z
\end{bmatrix}^T$$
- $R$ is the weight matrix
- $A$ is the state matrix obtained from the Clohessy-Wiltshire equations, such that,
  $$A =
\begin{bmatrix}
0 & 1 & 0 & 0 & 0 & 0 \\
3n^2 & 0 & 0 & 2n & 0 & 0 \\
0 & 0 & 0 & 1 & 0 & 0 \\
0 & -2n & 0 & 0 & 0 & 0 \\
0 & 0 & 0 & 0 & 0 & 1 \\
0 & 0 & 0 & 0 & -n^2 & 0 \\
\end{bmatrix}$$
- $B$ is the input matrix, such that,
  $$B =
\begin{bmatrix}
0&0&0\\
1&0&0\\
0&0&0\\
0&1&0\\
0&0&0\\
0&0&1\\
\end{bmatrix}$$
- $t_0$ is the time of start of transfer
- $t_f$ is the time of end of transfer
- $\vec{x}_0$ is the initial value of the state vector
- $\vec{x}_f$ is the final value of the state vector

Sometimes, it is also useful to subject the system to control constraints because in case of continuous low-thrust transfer, there are always bounds on the availability of thrust. Hence, if the maximum quantity of thrust available is $u_{max}$, then, an additional inequality constraint can be imposed on the optimal control problem posed above as:

$||\vec{u}(t)||\leq u_{max}$

Additionally, if the relative transfer is occurring such that the chaser and the target spacecraft are very close to each other, the collision-avoidance constraints can also be employed in the optimal control problem in the form of a minimum relative distance, $r_{min}$ as:

$||\vec{x}(t)||\geq r_{min}$

and because of obvious reasons, the final value of state-vector cannot be less than $r_{min}$.

== See also ==
- Bi-elliptic transfer
- Delta-v budget
- Geostationary transfer orbit
- Halo orbit
- Lissajous orbit
- List of orbits
- Orbital mechanics
