= Terminator orbit =

Orbit about a small Solar System body

Terminator orbits are spacecraft orbits about a small Solar System body in which the orbital plane is held approximately perpendicular to the body–Sun line, so that the spacecraft follows the body's terminator, the boundary between its lit and unlit hemispheres. They are also described in the astrodynamics literature as the terminator plane, a dawn–dusk orbit, or a "3 o'clock/9 o'clock" orbit. Because solar radiation pressure is a dominant perturbation in the weak gravity of a small body, this geometry provides passive stability that most other orbit orientations do not, and it has become a standard operational configuration for asteroid rendezvous missions.

Plane of orbit is perpendicular to Sun's rays

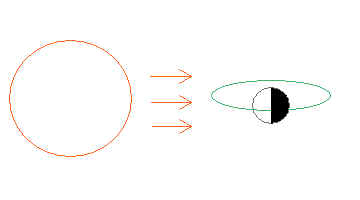
Plane of orbit is inline with Sun's rays

== Dynamics ==
At a small asteroid, gravitational attraction is weak enough that solar radiation pressure becomes one of the largest perturbing accelerations acting on a spacecraft. An orbit whose plane contains the Sun line is strongly perturbed by this force and may be driven to escape or to impact within days.

In the terminator plane the situation is different. The radiation-pressure acceleration is directed normal (perpendicular) to the orbit plane, and for a circular orbit the out-of-plane component averages to zero over a revolution. Rather than destabilising the orbit, the perturbation tends to circularise it: as perturbation strength grows the orbit becomes more circular, whereas as it vanishes the orbit approaches a rectilinear path. Terminator orbits also remain outside the body's shadow throughout, which avoids the thermal and power interruptions that affect orbits crossing into eclipse.

Stability is bounded. Scheeres gives a maximum semi-major axis for stable terminator orbits of approximately

$$a \le \frac{\sqrt{3}}{4}\sqrt{\mu / g}$$

where $\mu$ is the body's standard gravitational parameter and $g$ the solar-radiation-pressure acceleration on the spacecraft; the orbit must also lie outside roughly 1.5 resonance radii to avoid destabilisation by the body's irregular mass distribution.

Because the body itself orbits the Sun, the orbit plane must precess to stay on the terminator. This is achieved as a frozen orbit condition: a small eccentricity is chosen so that the argument of periapsis advances at a mean rate matching the body's heliocentric mean motion.

== Variants ==
Oki, Tsuda and Kawaguchi introduced quasi-stable terminator orbits (QSTO), which relax the strict terminator geometry to give mission designers more freedom in orbit selection and better optical observation geometry, while retaining long-term stability; they derived the analytical range over which such orbits exist. Subsequent work has developed numerical methods for computing quasi-terminator orbits.

== Use in missions ==
OSIRIS-REx used terminator orbits about 101955 Bennu during its Orbital A and Orbital B mission phases. Mission analyses examined the stability of these orbits and their sensitivity to manoeuvre execution errors.

== See also ==
- Terminator (solar)
- Frozen orbit
- Sun-synchronous orbit
- Solar radiation pressure
- Orbital perturbation analysis (spacecraft)
- Beta angle
