= Space rendezvous =

Series of orbital maneuvers

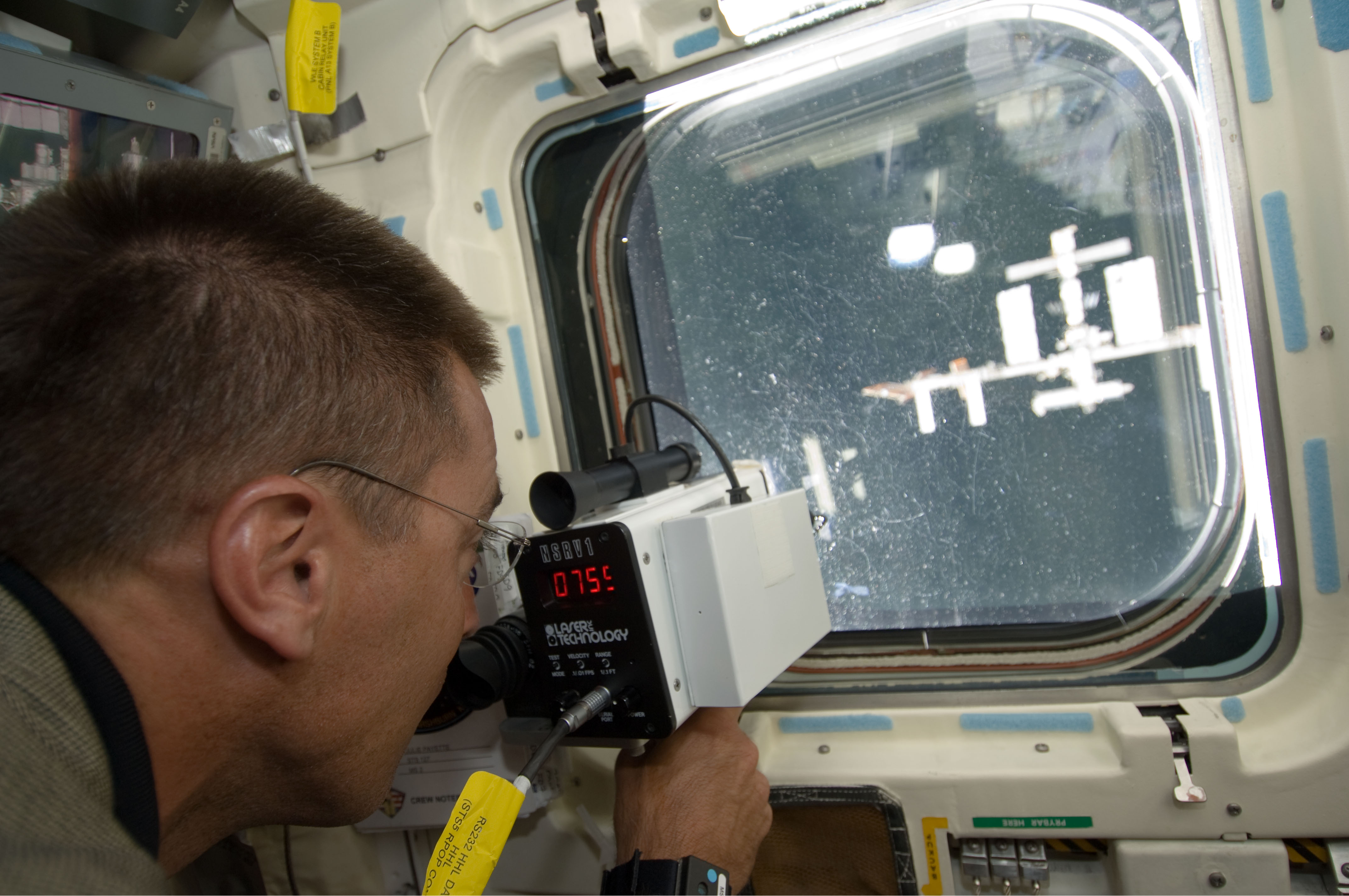
Astronaut Christopher Cassidy uses a rangefinder to determine distance between the Space Shuttle Endeavour and the International Space Station.

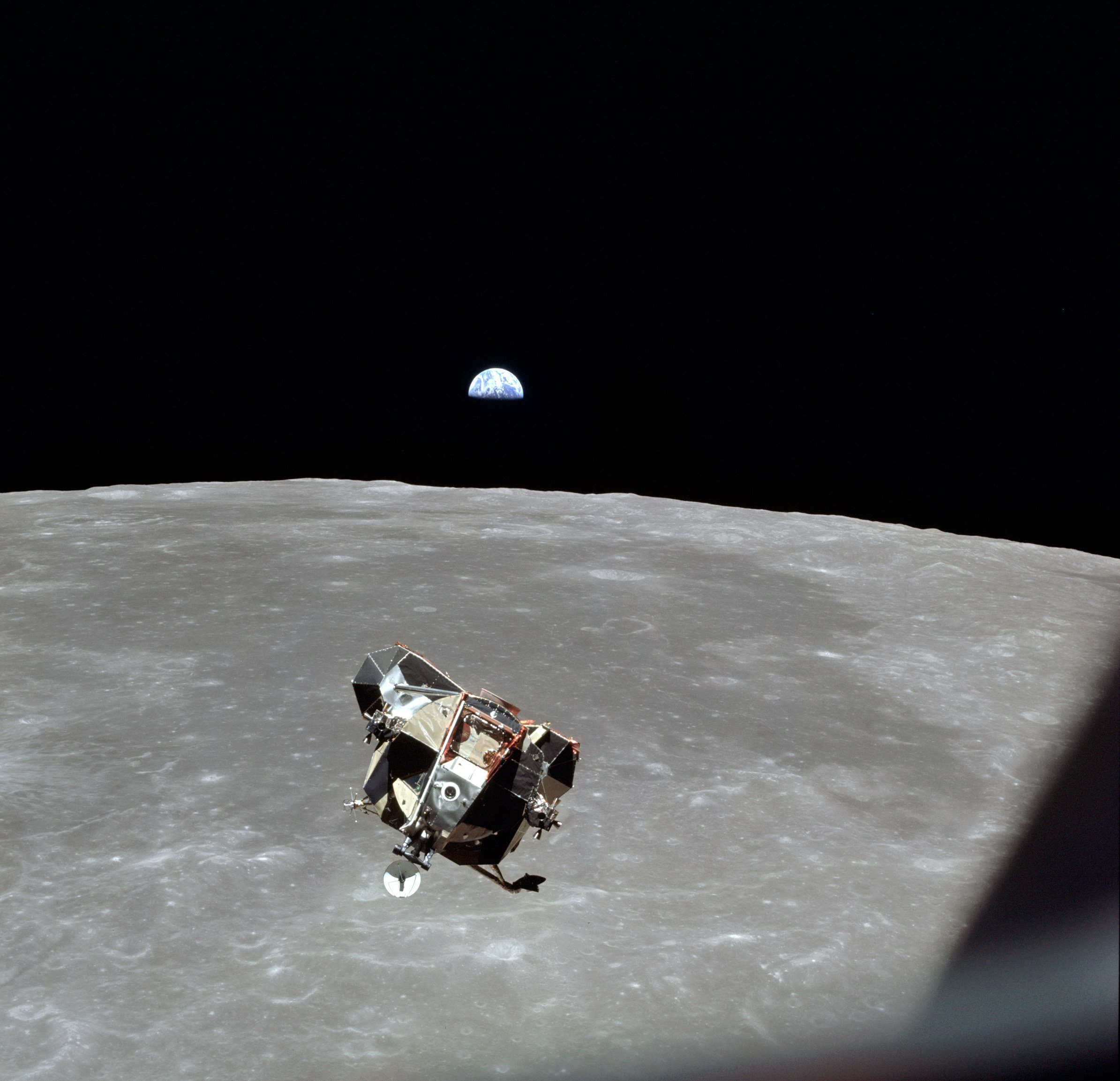
Lunar Module Eagle ascent stage rendezvous with the command module Columbia in lunar orbit after returning from a landing

A space rendezvous (/ˈrɒndeɪvuː/) is a set of orbital maneuvers during which two spacecraft, one of which is often a space station, arrive at the same orbit and approach to a very close distance (e.g. within visual contact). Rendezvous requires a precise match of the orbital velocities and position vectors of the two spacecraft, allowing them to remain at a constant distance through orbital station-keeping. Rendezvous may or may not be followed by docking or berthing, procedures which bring the spacecraft into physical contact and create a link between them.

The same rendezvous technique can be used for spacecraft "landing" on natural objects with a weak gravitational field, e.g. landing on one of the Martian moons would require the same matching of orbital velocities, followed by a "descent" that shares some similarities with docking.

== History ==
In its first human spaceflight program Vostok, the Soviet Union launched pairs of spacecraft from the same launch pad, one or two days apart (Vostok 3 and 4 in 1962, and Vostok 5 and 6 in 1963). In each case, the launch vehicles' guidance systems inserted the two craft into nearly identical orbits; however, this was not nearly precise enough to achieve rendezvous, as the Vostok lacked maneuvering thrusters to adjust its orbit to match that of its twin. The initial separation distances were in the range of 5 to 6.5 kilometers (3.1 to 4.0 mi), and slowly diverged to thousands of kilometers (over a thousand miles) over the course of the missions.

In early 1964 the Soviet Union guided two unmanned satellites designated Polyot 1 and 2 to within 5km, and the crafts were able to establish radio communication.

In 1963 Buzz Aldrin submitted his doctoral thesis titled, Line-Of-Sight Guidance Techniques For Manned Orbital Rendezvous. As a NASA astronaut, Aldrin worked to "translate complex orbital mechanics into relatively simple flight plans for my colleagues."

=== First attempt failed ===
NASA's first attempt at rendezvous was made on June 3, 1965, when US astronaut Jim McDivitt tried to maneuver his Gemini 4 craft to meet its spent Titan II launch vehicle's upper stage. McDivitt was unable to get close enough to achieve station-keeping, due to depth-perception problems, and stage propellant venting which kept moving it around. However, the Gemini 4 attempts at rendezvous were unsuccessful largely because NASA astronauts had not yet been taught the orbital mechanics involved in the process. Simply pointing the active vehicle's nose at the target and thrusting was unsuccessful. If the target is ahead in the orbit and the tracking vehicle increases speed, its altitude also increases, actually moving it away from the target. The higher altitude then increases orbital period due to Kepler's third law, putting the tracker not only above, but also behind the target. The proper technique requires changing the tracking vehicle's orbit to allow the rendezvous target to either catch up or be caught up with, and then at the correct moment changing to the same orbit as the target with no relative motion between the vehicles (for example, putting the tracker into a lower orbit, which has a shorter orbital period allowing it to catch up, then executing a Hohmann transfer back to the original orbital height).

As GPO engineer André Meyer later remarked, "There is a good explanation for what went wrong with rendezvous." The crew, like everyone else at MSC, "just didn't understand or reason out the orbital mechanics involved. As a result, we all got a whole lot smarter and really perfected rendezvous maneuvers, which Apollo now uses."

=== First successful rendezvous ===
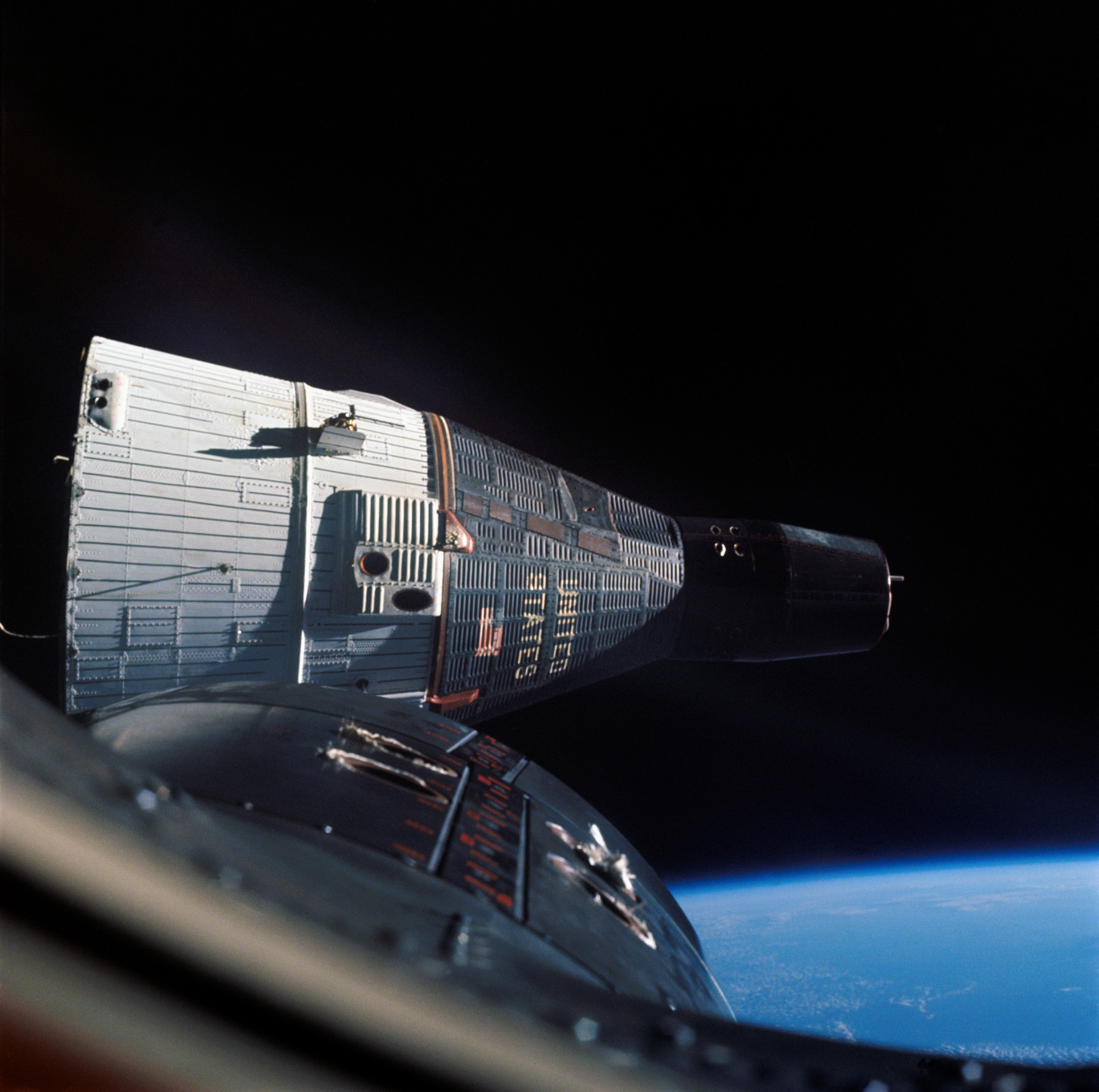
Gemini 7 photographed from Gemini 6 in 1965

Rendezvous was first successfully accomplished by US astronaut Wally Schirra on December 15, 1965. Schirra maneuvered the Gemini 6 spacecraft within 1 foot (30 cm) of its sister craft Gemini 7. The spacecraft were not equipped to dock with each other, but maintained station-keeping for more than 20 minutes. Schirra later commented:

Somebody said ... when you come to within three miles (5 km), you've rendezvoused. If anybody thinks they've pulled a rendezvous off at three miles (5 km), have fun! This is when we started doing our work. I don't think rendezvous is over until you are stopped – completely stopped – with no relative motion between the two vehicles, at a range of approximately 120 feet (37 m). That's rendezvous! From there on, it's stationkeeping. That's when you can go back and play the game of driving a car or driving an airplane or pushing a skateboard – it's about that simple.

Schirra used another metaphor to describe the difference between the two nations' achievements:

[The Russian "rendezvous"] was a passing glance—the equivalent of a male walking down a busy main street with plenty of traffic whizzing by and he spots a cute girl walking on the other side. He's going 'Hey wait' but she's gone. That's a passing glance, not a rendezvous.

=== First docking ===
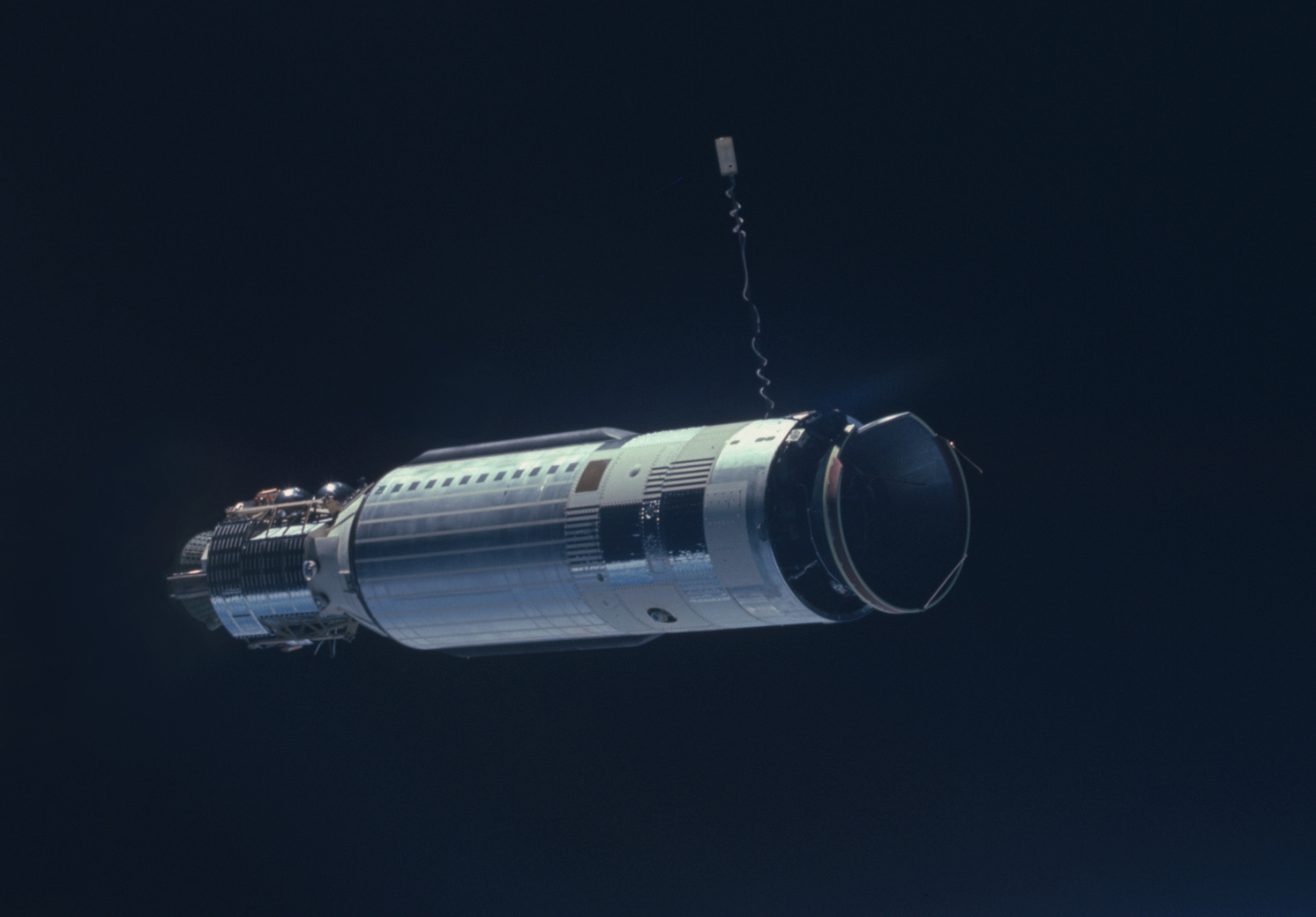
Gemini 8 Agena target vehicle

Gemini 8 docking with Agena vehicle

The first docking of two spacecraft was achieved on March 16, 1966, when Gemini 8, under the command of Neil Armstrong, rendezvoused and docked with an uncrewed Agena Target Vehicle. Gemini 6 was to have been the first docking mission, but had to be cancelled when that mission's Agena vehicle was destroyed during launch.

The Soviets carried out the first automated, uncrewed docking between Cosmos 186 and Cosmos 188 on October 30, 1967.

The first Soviet cosmonaut to attempt a manual docking was Georgy Beregovoy who unsuccessfully tried to dock his Soyuz 3 craft with the uncrewed Soyuz 2 in October 1968. Automated systems brought the craft to within 200 meters (660 ft), while Beregovoy brought this closer with manual control.

The first successful crewed docking occurred on January 16, 1969, when Soyuz 4 and Soyuz 5 docked, collecting the two crew members of Soyuz 5, which had to perform an extravehicular activity to reach Soyuz 4.

In March 1969 Apollo 9 achieved the first internal transfer of crew members between two docked spacecraft.

The first rendezvous of two spacecraft from different countries took place in 1975, when an Apollo spacecraft docked with a Soyuz spacecraft as part of the Apollo–Soyuz mission.

A multiple space docking took place when Soyuz 26 and Soyuz 27 were both docked to the Salyut 6 space station during January 1978. This was the first time a second crew visited a space station with another crew already present.

== Uses ==
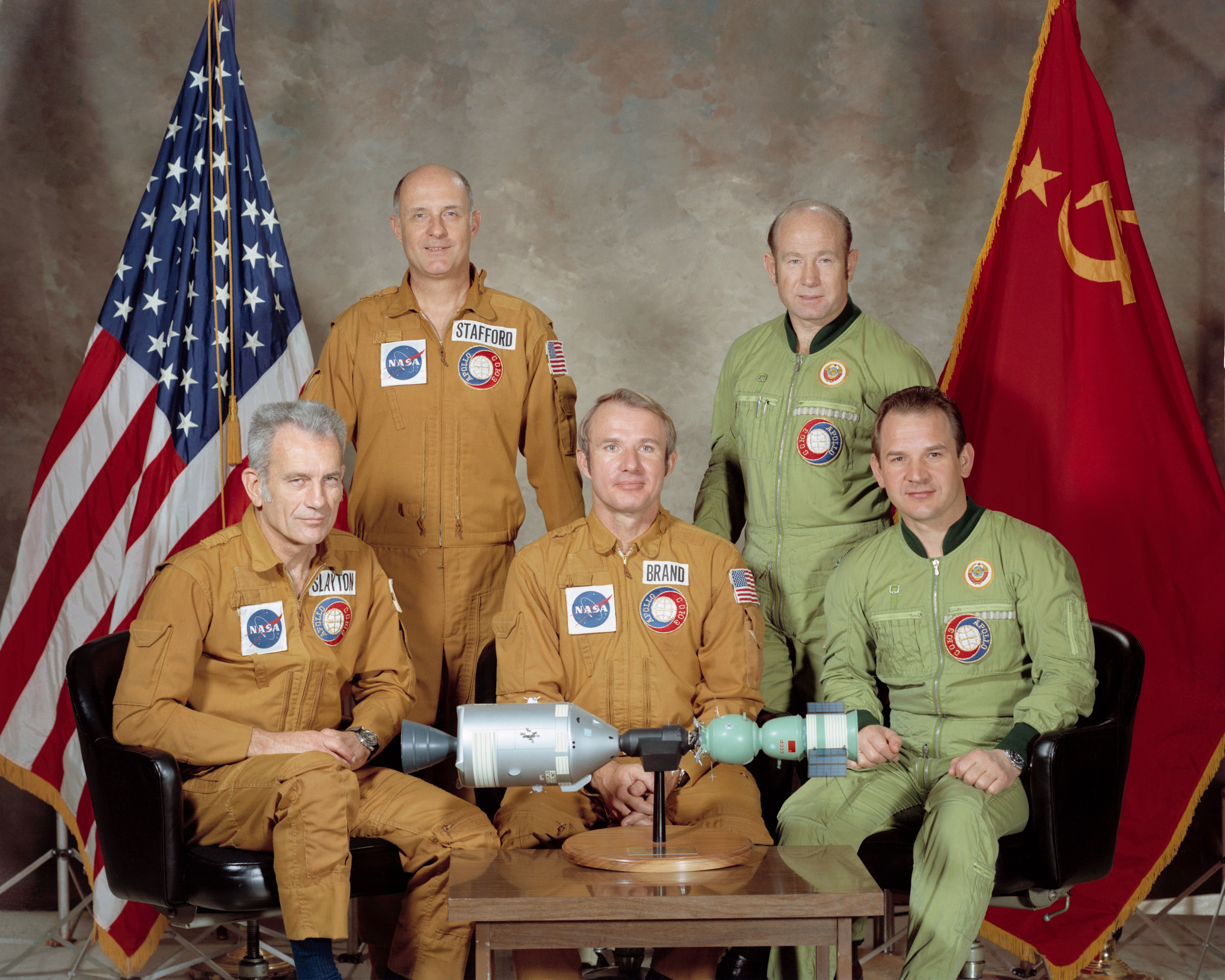
Most rendezvous are for docking, as in this photo of the crews and spaceship models of the historic first time Soviet and US spacecraft Apollo–Soyuz docking in 1975 of the concluding Space Race.

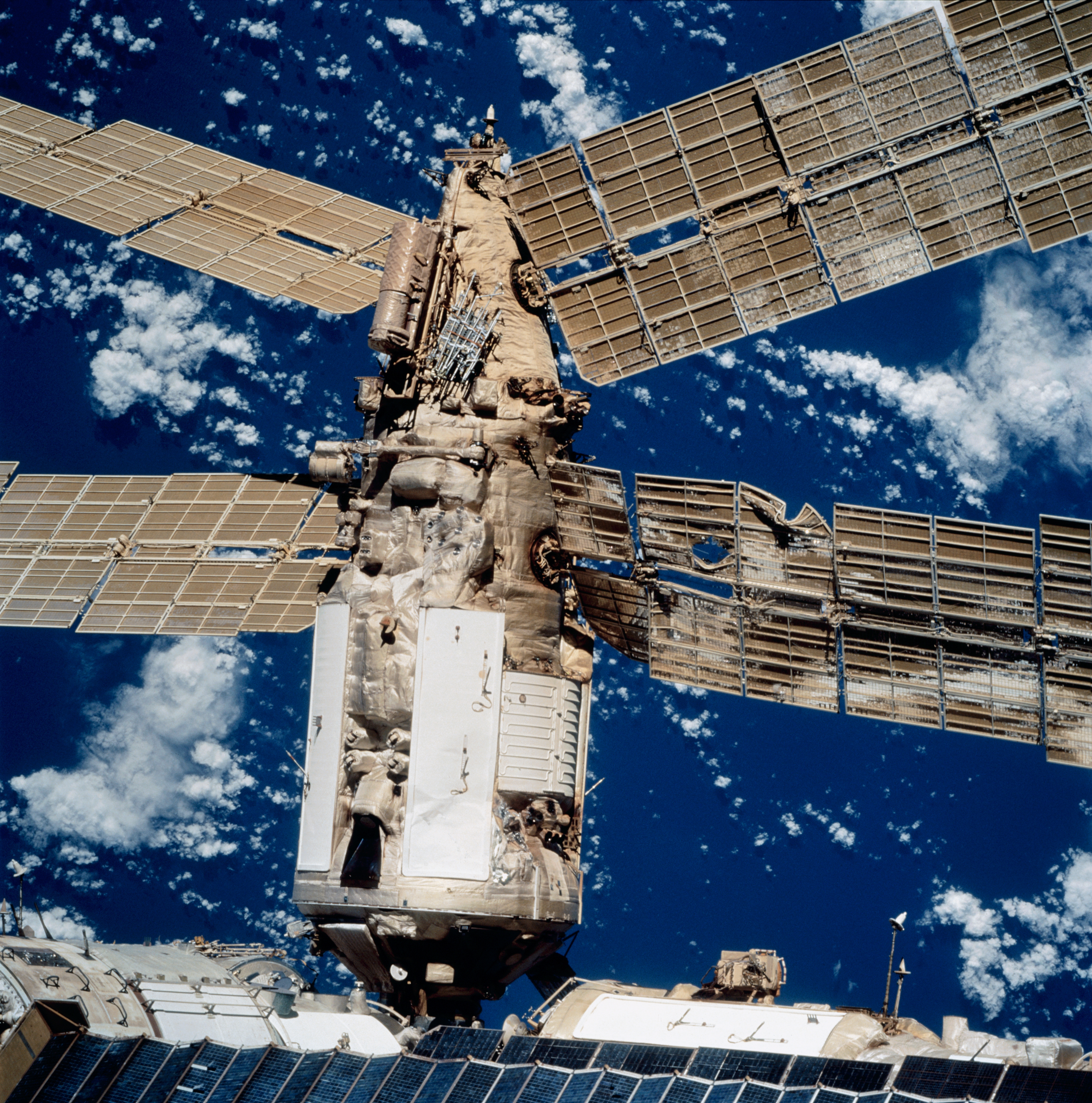
Damaged solar arrays on Mir's Spektr module following a collision with an uncrewed Progress spacecraft in September 1997 as part of Shuttle-Mir. The Progress spacecraft were used for re-supplying the station. In this space rendezvous gone wrong, the Progress collided with Mir, beginning a depressurization that was halted by closing the hatch to Spektr.

A rendezvous takes place each time a spacecraft brings crew members or supplies to an orbiting space station. The first spacecraft to do this was Soyuz 11, which successfully docked with the Salyut 1 station on June 7, 1971. Human spaceflight missions have successfully made rendezvous with six Salyut stations, with Skylab, with Mir and with the International Space Station (ISS). Currently Soyuz spacecraft are used at approximately six month intervals to transport crew members to and from ISS. With the introduction of NASA's Commercial Crew Program, the US is able to use their own launch vehicle along with the Soyuz, an updated version of SpaceX's Cargo Dragon; Crew Dragon.

Robotic spacecraft are also used to rendezvous with and resupply space stations. Soyuz and Progress spacecraft have automatically docked with both Mir and the ISS using the Kurs docking system, Europe's Automated Transfer Vehicle also used this system to dock with the Russian segment of the ISS. Several uncrewed spacecraft use NASA's berthing mechanism rather than a docking port. The Japanese H-II Transfer Vehicle (HTV), SpaceX Dragon, and Orbital Sciences' Cygnus spacecraft all maneuver to a close rendezvous and maintain station-keeping, allowing the ISS Canadarm2 to grapple and move the spacecraft to a berthing port on the US segment. However the updated version of Cargo Dragon will no longer need to berth but instead will autonomously dock directly to the space station. The Russian segment only uses docking ports so it is not possible for HTV, Dragon and Cygnus to find a berth there.

Space rendezvous has been used for a variety of other purposes, including recent service missions to the Hubble Space Telescope. Historically, for the missions of Project Apollo that landed astronauts on the Moon, the ascent stage of the Apollo Lunar Module would rendezvous and dock with the Apollo Command/Service Module in lunar orbit rendezvous maneuvers. Also, the STS-49 crew rendezvoused with and attached a rocket motor to the Intelsat VI F-3 communications satellite to allow it to make an orbital maneuver.

Possible future rendezvous may be made by a yet to be developed automated Hubble Robotic Vehicle (HRV), and by the CX-OLEV, which is being developed for rendezvous with a geosynchronous satellite that has run out of fuel. The CX-OLEV would take over orbital stationkeeping and/or finally bring the satellite to a graveyard orbit, after which the CX-OLEV can possibly be reused for another satellite. Gradual transfer from the geostationary transfer orbit to the geosynchronous orbit will take a number of months, using Hall effect thrusters.

Alternatively the two spacecraft are already together, and just undock and dock in a different way:

- Soyuz spacecraft from one docking point to another on the ISS or Salyut
- In the Apollo spacecraft, a maneuver known as transposition, docking, and extraction was performed an hour or so after Trans Lunar Injection of the sequence third stage of the Saturn V rocket / LM inside LM adapter / CSM (in order from bottom to top at launch, also the order from back to front with respect to the current motion), with CSM crewed, LM at this stage uncrewed:
  - the CSM separated, while the four upper panels of the LM adapter were disposed of
  - the CSM turned 180 degrees (from engine backward, toward LM, to forward)
  - the CSM connected to the LM while that was still connected to the third stage
  - the CSM/LM combination then separated from the third stage

NASA sometimes refers to "Rendezvous, Proximity-Operations, Docking, and Undocking" (RPODU) for the set of all spaceflight procedures that are typically needed around spacecraft operations where two spacecraft work in proximity to one another with intent to connect to one another.

== Phases and methods ==
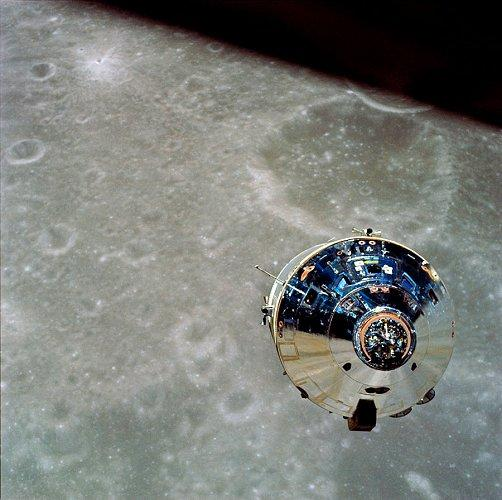
Command and service module Charlie Brown as seen from Lunar Module Snoopy

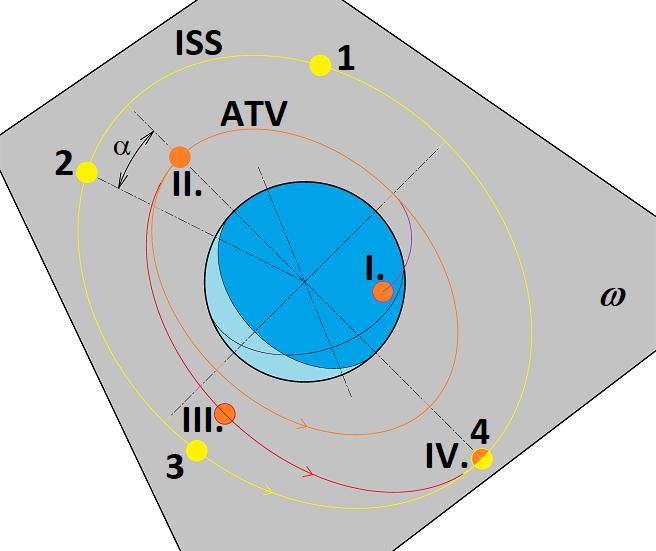
Orbital rendezvous. 1/ Both spacecraft must be in the same orbital plane. ISS flies in a higher orbit (lower speed), ATV flies in a lower orbit and catches up with ISS. 2/At the moment when the ATV and the ISS make an alpha angle (about 2°), the ATV crosses the elliptical orbit to the ISS.

The standard technique for rendezvous and docking is to dock an active vehicle, the "chaser", with a passive "target". This technique has been used successfully for the Gemini, Apollo, Apollo/Soyuz, Salyut, Skylab, Mir, ISS, and Tiangong programs.

To properly understand spacecraft rendezvous it is essential to understand the relation between spacecraft velocity and orbit. A spacecraft in a certain orbit cannot arbitrarily alter its velocity. Each orbit correlates to a certain orbital velocity. If the spacecraft fires thrusters and increases (or decreases) its velocity it will obtain a different orbit, one with a higher or lower altitude. In circular orbits, higher orbits have a lower orbital velocity. Lower orbits have a higher orbital velocity.

For orbital rendezvous to occur, both spacecraft must be in the same orbital plane, and the phase of the orbit (the position of the spacecraft in the orbit) must be matched. For docking, the speed of the two vehicles must also be matched. The "chaser" is placed in a slightly lower orbit than the target. The lower the orbit, the higher the orbital velocity. The difference in orbital velocities of chaser and target is therefore such that the chaser is faster than the target, and catches up with it.

Once the two spacecraft are sufficiently close, the chaser's orbit is synchronized with the target's orbit. That is, the chaser will be accelerated. This increase in velocity carries the chaser to a higher orbit. The increase in velocity is chosen such that the chaser approximately assumes the orbit of the target. Stepwise, the chaser closes in on the target, until proximity operations (see below) can be started. In the very final phase, the closure rate is reduced by use of the active vehicle's reaction control system. Docking typically occurs at a rate of 0.1 ft/s (0.030 m/s) to 0.2 ft/s (0.061 m/s).

=== Rendezvous phases ===
Space rendezvous of an active, or "chaser", spacecraft with an (assumed) passive spacecraft may be divided into several phases, and typically starts with the two spacecraft in separate orbits, typically separated by more than 10,000 kilometers (6,200 mi):

| Phase | Separation distance | Typical phase duration |
|---|---|---|
| Drift Orbit A (out of sight, out of contact) | >2 λ_{max} (Note: λ_{max} is the angular radius of the spacecraft's true horizon as seen from the center of the planet; for LEO, it is the maximum Earth central angle from the altitude of the spacecraft.) | 1 to 20 days |
| Drift Orbit B (in sight, in contact) | 2 λ_{max} to 1 kilometer (3,300 ft) | 1 to 5 days |
| Proximity Operations A | 1,000–100 meters (3,280–330 ft) | 1 to 5 orbits |
| Proximity Operations B | 100–10 meters (328–33 ft) | 45 – 90 minutes |
| Docking | <10 meters (33 ft) | <5 minutes |

A variety of techniques may be used to effect the translational and rotational maneuvers necessary for proximity operations and docking.

=== Methods of approach ===
The two most common methods of approach for proximity operations are in-line with the flight path of the spacecraft (called V-bar, as it is along the velocity vector of the target) and perpendicular to the flight path along the line of the radius of the orbit (called R-bar, as it is along the radial vector, with respect to Earth, of the target). The chosen method of approach depends on safety, spacecraft / thruster design, mission timeline, and, especially for docking with the ISS, on the location of the assigned docking port.

==== V-bar approach ====
The V-bar approach is an approach of the "chaser" horizontally along the passive spacecraft's velocity vector. That is, from behind or from ahead, and in the same direction as the orbital motion of the passive target. The motion is parallel to the target's orbital velocity. In the V-bar approach from behind, the chaser fires small thrusters to increase its velocity in the direction of the target. This, of course, also drives the chaser to a higher orbit. To keep the chaser on the V-vector, other thrusters are fired in the radial direction. If this is omitted (for example due to a thruster failure), the chaser will be carried to a higher orbit, which is associated with an orbital velocity lower than the target's. Consequently, the target moves faster than the chaser and the distance between them increases. This is called a natural braking effect, and is a natural safeguard in case of a thruster failure.

STS-104 was the third Space Shuttle mission to conduct a V-bar arrival at the International Space Station. The V-bar, or velocity vector, extends along a line directly ahead of the station. Shuttles approach the ISS along the V-bar when docking at the PMA-2 docking port.

==== R-bar approach ====
The R-bar approach consists of the chaser moving below or above the target spacecraft, along its radial vector. The motion is orthogonal to the orbital velocity of the passive spacecraft. When below the target the chaser fires radial thrusters to close in on the target. By this it increases its altitude. However, the orbital velocity of the chaser remains unchanged (thruster firings in the radial direction have no effect on the orbital velocity). Now in a slightly higher position, but with an orbital velocity that does not correspond to the local circular velocity, the chaser slightly falls behind the target. Small rocket pulses in the orbital velocity direction are necessary to keep the chaser along the radial vector of the target. If these rocket pulses are not executed (for example due to a thruster failure), the chaser will move away from the target. This is a natural braking effect. For the R-bar approach, this effect is stronger than for the V-bar approach, making the R-bar approach the safer one of the two. Generally, the R-bar approach from below is preferable, as the chaser is in a lower (faster) orbit than the target, and thus "catches up" with it. For the R-bar approach from above, the chaser is in a higher (slower) orbit than the target, and thus has to wait for the target to approach it.

Astrotech proposed meeting ISS cargo needs with a vehicle which would approach the station, "using a traditional nadir R-bar approach." The nadir R-bar approach is also used for flights to the ISS of H-II Transfer Vehicles, and of SpaceX Dragon vehicles.

==== Z-bar approach ====
An approach of the active, or "chaser", spacecraft horizontally from the side & orthogonal to the orbital plane of the passive spacecraft—that is, from the side and out-of-plane of the orbit of the passive spacecraft—is called a Z-bar approach.

== Surface rendezvous ==
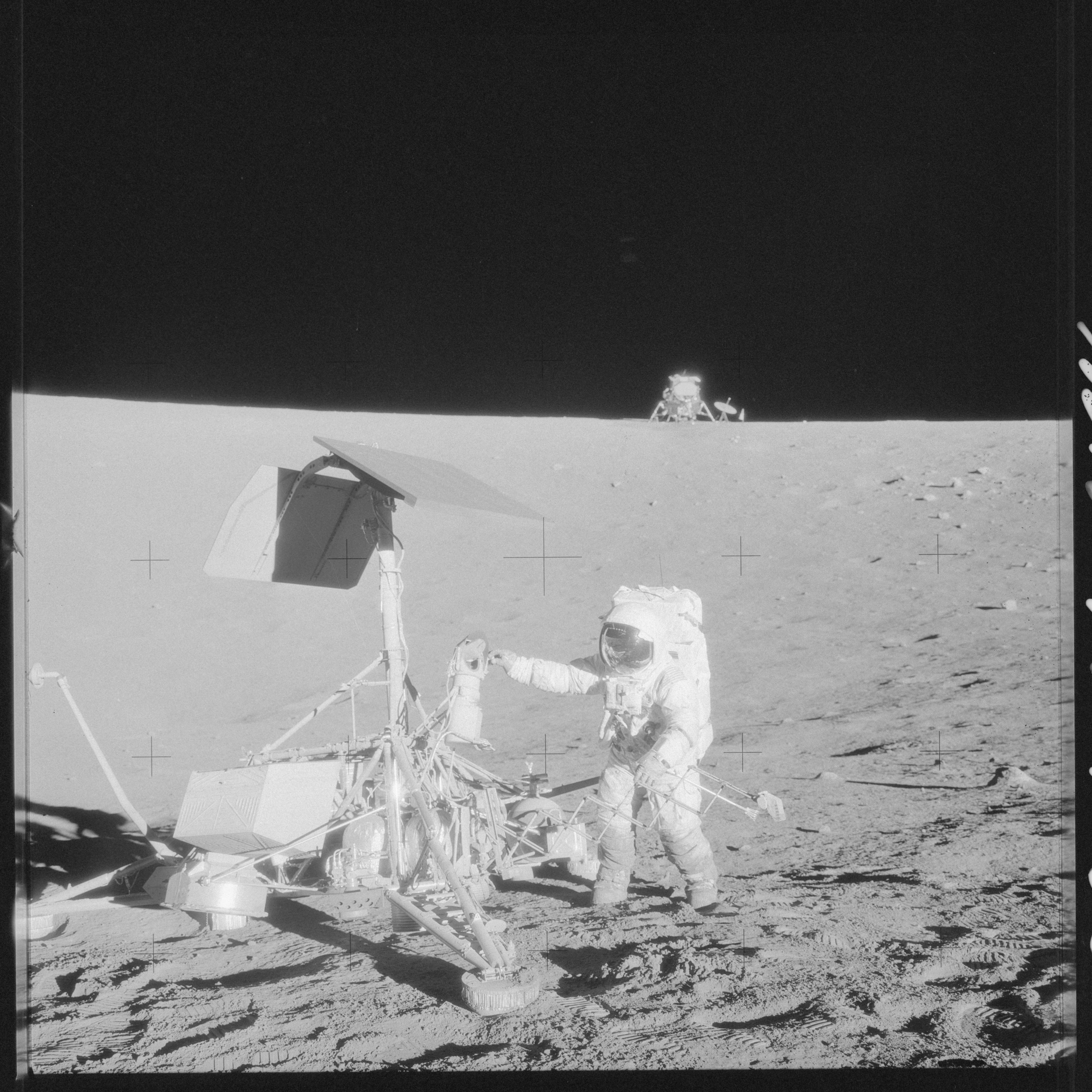
Apollo 12 astronaut Conrad with Surveyor 3 and Apollo 2 lander in the background, in a first ever visit of an independent mission beyond Low Earth Orbit

Apollo 12, the second crewed lunar landing, performed the first ever rendezvous outside of Low Earth Orbit by landing close to Surveyor 3 and taking parts of it back to Earth.

== See also ==
- Androgynous Peripheral Attach System
- Clohessy-Wiltshire equations for co-orbit analysis
- Common Berthing Mechanism
- Deliberate crash landings on extraterrestrial bodies
- Flyby (spaceflight)
- Lunar orbit rendezvous
- Mars orbit rendezvous
- Nodal precession of orbits around the Earth's axis
- Path-constrained rendezvous – the process of moving an orbiting object from its current position to a desired position, in such a way that no orbiting obstacles are contacted along the way
- Soyuz Kontakt
