= Clohessy–Wiltshire equations =

Simplified model of orbital relative motion

The Clohessy–Wiltshire equations describe a simplified model of orbital relative motion, in which the target is in a circular orbit, and the chaser spacecraft is in an elliptical or circular orbit. This model gives a first-order approximation of the chaser's motion in a target-centered coordinate system. It is used to plan the rendezvous of the chaser with the target.

== History ==
Early results about relative orbital motion were published by George William Hill in 1878. Hill's paper discussed the orbital motion of the moon relative to the Earth.

In 1960, W. H. Clohessy and R. S. Wiltshire published the Clohessy–Wiltshire equations to describe relative orbital motion of a general satellite for the purpose of designing control systems to achieve orbital rendezvous.

== System definition ==
Suppose a target body is moving in a circular orbit and a chaser body is moving in an elliptical orbit. Let $x, y, z$ be the relative position of the chaser relative to the target with $x$ radially outward from the target body, $y$ is along the orbit track of the target body, and $z$ is along the orbital angular momentum vector of the target body (i.e., $x,y,z$ form a right-handed triad). Then, the Clohessy–Wiltshire equations are
$$\begin{aligned}
\ddot{x} &= 3n^{2}x + 2n\dot{y} \\
\ddot{y} &= -2n\dot{x} \\
\ddot{z} &= -n^{2}z
\end{aligned}$$
where $n = \sqrt{\mu / a^3}$ is the orbital rate (in units of radians/second) of the target body, $a$ is the radius of the target body's circular orbit, $\mu$ is the standard gravitational parameter,

If we define the state vector as $\mathbf{x} = (x, y, z, \dot x, \dot y, \dot z)$, the Clohessy–Wiltshire equations can be written as a linear time-invariant (LTI) system,
$$\dot \mathbf{x} = A\mathbf{x}$$
where the state matrix $A$ is
$$A = \begin{bmatrix}
0 & 0 & 0 & 1 & 0 & 0 \\
0 & 0 & 0 & 0 & 1 & 0 \\
0 & 0 & 0 & 0 & 0 & 1 \\
3n^2 & 0 & 0 & 0 & 2 n & 0 \\
0 & 0 & 0 & -2 n & 0 & 0 \\
0 & 0 & -n^2 & 0 & 0 & 0
\end{bmatrix}.$$

For a satellite in low Earth orbit, $\mu = 3.986 \times 10^{14} \; \mathrm{m^3/s^2}$ and $a = 6,793,137 \; \mathrm{m}$, implying $n = 0.00113 \; \mathrm{s^{-1}}$, corresponding to an orbital period of about 93 minutes.

If the chaser satellite has mass $m$ and thrusters that apply a force $F = (F_x, F_y, F_z),$ then the relative dynamics are given by the LTI control system
$$\dot \mathbf{x} = A \mathbf{x} + B \mathbf{u}$$
where $\mathbf{u} = F / m$ is the applied force per unit mass and
$$\boldsymbol{B} = \begin{bmatrix}
0 & 0 & 0 \\
0 & 0 & 0 \\
0 & 0 & 0 \\
1 & 0 & 0 \\
0 & 1 & 0 \\
0 & 0 & 1
\end{bmatrix}.$$

== Solution ==
We can obtain closed form solutions of these coupled differential equations in matrix form, allowing us to find the position and velocity of the chaser at any time given the initial position and velocity.
$$\begin{aligned}
\delta\vec{r}(t) &= [\Phi_{rr}(t)]\delta\vec{r_0} + [\Phi_{rv}(t)]\delta\vec{v_0} \\
\delta\vec{v}(t) &= [\Phi_{vr}(t)]\delta\vec{r_0} + [\Phi_{vv}(t)]\delta\vec{v_0}
\end{aligned}$$
where:
$$\begin{aligned}
\Phi_{rr}(t) &= \begin{bmatrix} 4-3\cos{nt} & 0 & 0 \\ 6(\sin{nt}-nt) & 1 & 0 \\ 0 & 0 & \cos{nt} \end{bmatrix} \\
\Phi_{rv}(t) &= \begin{bmatrix} \frac{1}{n}\sin{nt} & \frac{2}{n}(1-\cos{nt}) & 0 \\ \frac{2}{n}(\cos{nt}-1) & \frac{1}{n}(4\sin{nt}-3nt) & 0 \\ 0 & 0 & \frac{1}{n}\sin{nt} \end{bmatrix} \\
\Phi_{vr}(t) &= \begin{bmatrix} 3n\sin{nt} & 0 & 0 \\ 6n(\cos{nt}-1) & 0 & 0 \\ 0 & 0 & -n\sin{nt} \end{bmatrix} \\
\Phi_{vv}(t) &= \begin{bmatrix} \cos{nt} & 2\sin{nt} & 0 \\ -2\sin{nt} & 4\cos{nt}-3 & 0 \\ 0 & 0 & \cos{nt} \end{bmatrix}
\end{aligned}$$
Note that $\Phi_{vr}(t) = \dot{\Phi}_{rr}(t)$ and $\Phi_{vv}(t) = \dot{\Phi}_{rv}(t)$. Since these matrices are easily invertible, we can also solve for the initial conditions given only the final conditions and the properties of the target vehicle's orbit.

=== Rendezvous and impulsive solutions ===
While the state transition matrices are invertible, a nontrivial rendezvous cannot be achieved by unforced motion alone. Requiring both
$$\delta \mathbf{r}(t_f)=\mathbf{0}, \qquad \delta \mathbf{v}(t_f)=\mathbf{0}$$
implies the trivial initial condition $\delta \mathbf{r}_0=\delta \mathbf{v}_0=\mathbf{0}$, since the full state transition matrix is nonsingular. In practice, rendezvous is achieved using impulsive maneuvers, such as a two-impulse solution:

- First, an initial velocity change $\Delta \mathbf{v}_0$ is applied so that the subsequent ballistic trajectory satisfies $\delta \mathbf{r}(t_f)=\mathbf{0}$, which yields
  $$\delta \mathbf{v}_0^+ = -\Phi_{rv}(t_f)^{-1}\Phi_{rr}(t_f)\,\delta \mathbf{r}_0.$$
- The spacecraft then evolves under the Clohessy–Wiltshire equations.
- A second impulse at $t_f$ removes the residual relative velocity $\Delta \mathbf{v}_f = -\delta \mathbf{v}(t_f)$.

This two-impulse formulation is widely used for proximity operations and orbital rendezvous.

== See also ==
- Orbital maneuver
- Orbital mechanics
- Space rendezvous
