= Porkchop plot =

Chart used to plan spacecraft launches

Representative porkchop plot for the 2005 Mars launch opportunity (horizontal axis: departure dates in mm/dd notation, vertical axis: arrival dates (mm/dd)) A given blue contour represents a solution with a constant C_{3}. The center of the porkchop is the optimal solution for the lowest C_{3}. The red lines represent trips with the same travel time for the trajectory. The green lines represent the Sun-Earth-Probe angle upon departure.

In orbital mechanics, a porkchop plot (also pork-chop plot) is a chart that shows level curves of equal characteristic energy (C_{3}) against combinations of launch date and arrival date for a particular interplanetary flight. The chart shows the characteristic energy ranges in zones around the local minima, which resembles the shape of a porkchop slice.

By examining the results of the porkchop plot, engineers can determine when a launch opportunity exists (a 'launch window') that is compatible with the capabilities of a particular spacecraft. A given contour, called a porkchop curve, represents constant C_{3}, and the center of the porkchop the optimal minimum C_{3}. The orbital elements of the solution, where the fixed values are the departure date, the arrival date, and the length of the flight, were first solved mathematically in 1761 by Johann Heinrich Lambert, and the equation is generally known as Lambert's problem (or theorem).

== Math ==
The general form of characteristic energy can be computed as:

$C_3 = v_\infty^2\,\!$

where $v_\infty \,$ is the orbital velocity when the orbital distance tends to infinity. Note that, since the kinetic energy is $\frac{1}{2}mv^2$, C_{3} is in fact equal to twice the magnitude of the specific orbital energy, $\epsilon$, of the escaping object.

== Use ==
For the Voyager program, engineers at JPL plotted around 10,000 potential trajectories using porkchop plots, from which they selected around 100 that were optimal for the mission objectives. The plots allowed them to reduce or eliminate planetary encounters taking place over the Thanksgiving or Christmas holidays, and to plan the completion of the mission's primary goals before the end of the fiscal year 1981.

== See also ==
- Orbit
- Parabolic trajectory
- Hyperbolic trajectory
