= Vis-viva equation =

Concept in gravitational orbital mechanics

In astrodynamics, the vis-viva equation is one of the equations that model the motion of orbiting bodies. It is the direct result of the principle of conservation of mechanical energy which applies when the only force acting on an object is its own weight which is the gravitational force determined by the product of the mass of the object and the strength of the surrounding gravitational field.

Vis viva (Latin for "living force") is a term from the history of mechanics and the name given to the orbital equation originally derived by Isaac Newton. It represents the principle that the difference between the total work of the accelerating forces of a system and that of the retarding forces is equal to one half the vis viva accumulated or lost in the system while the work is being done.

== Formulation ==
For any Keplerian orbit (elliptic, parabolic, hyperbolic, or radial), the vis-viva equation is as follows:
$$v^2 = GM \left({ 2 \over r} - {1 \over a}\right)$$
where:

- $v$ is the relative speed of the two bodies
- $r$ is the distance between the two bodies' centers of mass
- $a$ is the length of the semi-major axis ($a > 0$ for ellipses, $a = \infty$ or $1/a = 0$ for parabolas, and $a < 0$ for hyperbolas)
- $G$ is the gravitational constant
- $M$ is the mass of the central body

The product of $GM$ can also be expressed as the standard gravitational parameter using the Greek letter $\mu$.

== Practical applications ==
Given the total mass and the scalars $r$ and $v$ at a single point of the orbit, one can compute:

- $r$ and $v$ at any other point in the orbit; and
- the specific orbital energy $\varepsilon\,\!$, allowing an object orbiting a larger object to be classified as having not enough energy to remain in orbit, hence being "suborbital" (a ballistic missile, for example), having enough energy to be "orbital", but without the possibility to complete a full orbit anyway because it eventually collides with the other body, or having enough energy to come from and/or go to infinity (as a meteor, for example).

The formula for escape velocity can be obtained from the Vis-viva equation by taking the limit as $a$ approaches $\infty$:
$$v_e^2 = GM \left(\frac{2}{r}-0 \right) \rightarrow v_e = \sqrt{\frac{2GM}{r}}$$
For a given orbital radius, the escape velocity will be $\sqrt{2}$ times the orbital velocity.

== Derivation for elliptic orbits (0 ≤ eccentricity < 1) ==
Specific total energy,
$$\varepsilon =\frac{v^2}{2} - \frac{GM}{r}$$
is constant throughout the orbit. Using the subscripts $a$ for apoapsis (apogee) and $p$ for periapsis (perigee), the constant energy at two points gives:
$$\frac{v_a^2}{2} - \frac{GM}{r_a} = \frac{v_p^2}{2} - \frac{GM}{r_p}$$

Rearranging,
$$\frac{v_a^2}{2} - \frac{v_p^2}{2} = \frac{GM}{r_a} - \frac{GM}{r_p}$$

Recalling that for an elliptical orbit (and hence also a circular orbit) the velocity and radius vectors are perpendicular at apoapsis and periapsis, conservation of angular momentum requires specific angular momentum $h = r_pv_p = r_av_a = \text{constant}$, thus $v_p = \frac{r_a}{r_p}v_a$:
$$\frac{1}{2} \left( 1-\frac{r_a^2}{r_p^2} \right) v_a^2 = \frac{GM}{r_a} - \frac{GM}{r_p}$$
$$\frac{1}{2} \left( \frac{r_p^2 - r_a^2}{r_p^2} \right) v_a^2 = \frac{GM}{r_a} - \frac{GM}{r_p}$$

Isolating the kinetic energy at apoapsis and simplifying,
$$\begin{align}
\frac{1}{2}v_a^2 &= \left( \frac{GM}{r_a} - \frac{GM}{r_p}\right) \cdot \frac{r_p^2}{r_p^2-r_a^2} \\
\frac{1}{2}v_a^2 &= GM \left( \frac{r_p - r_a}{r_ar_p} \right) \frac{r_p^2}{r_p^2-r_a^2} \\
\frac{1}{2}v_a^2 &= GM \frac{r_p}{r_a(r_p+r_a)}
\end{align}$$

From the geometry of an ellipse, $2a=r_p+r_a$ where a is the length of the semimajor axis. Thus,
$$\frac{1}{2} v_a^2 = GM \frac{2a-r_a}{r_a(2a)} = GM \left( \frac{1}{r_a} - \frac{1}{2a} \right) = \frac{GM}{r_a} - \frac{GM}{2a}$$

Substituting this into our original expression for specific orbital energy,
$$\varepsilon = \frac{v^2}{2} - \frac{GM}{r} = \frac{v_p^2}{2} - \frac{GM}{r_p} = \frac{v_a^2}{2} - \frac{GM}{r_a} = - \frac{GM}{2a}$$

Thus, $\varepsilon = - \frac{GM}{2a}$ and the vis-viva equation may be written
$$\frac{v^2}{2} - \frac{GM}{r} = -\frac{GM}{2a}$$
or
$$v^2 = GM \left( \frac{2}{r} - \frac{1}{a} \right)$$

Therefore, the conserved angular momentum $L = mh$ can be derived using $r_a + r_p = 2a$ and $r_a r_p = b^2$, where $a$ is semi-major axis and $b$ is semi-minor axis of the elliptical orbit, as follows:
$$v_a^2 = GM \left( \frac{2}{r_a} - \frac{1}{a} \right) = \frac{GM}{a} \left( \frac{2a-r_a}{r_a} \right) = \frac{GM}{a} \left( \frac{r_p}{r_a} \right) = \frac{GM}{a} \left( \frac{b}{r_a} \right)^2$$
and alternately,
$$v_p^2 = GM \left( \frac{2}{r_p} - \frac{1}{a} \right) = \frac{GM}{a} \left( \frac{2a-r_p}{r_p} \right) = \frac{GM}{a} \left( \frac{r_a}{r_p} \right) = \frac{GM}{a} \left( \frac{b}{r_p} \right)^2$$

Therefore, specific angular momentum $h = r_p v_p = r_a v_a = b \sqrt{\frac{GM}{a}}$, and

Total angular momentum $L = mh = mb \sqrt{\frac{GM}{a}}$
