= Circular orbit =

Orbit with a fixed distance from the barycenter

Isaac Newton's Cannonball. Path C depicts a circular orbit.

A circular orbit is an orbit with a fixed distance around the barycenter; that is, in the shape of a circle. In this case, not only the distance, but also the speed, angular speed, potential and kinetic energy are constant. There is no periapsis or apoapsis. This orbit has no radial version.

Listed below is a circular orbit in astrodynamics or celestial mechanics under standard assumptions. Here the centripetal force is the gravitational force, and the axis mentioned above is the line through the center of the central mass perpendicular to the orbital plane.

== Circular acceleration ==
Transverse acceleration (perpendicular to velocity) causes a change in direction. If it is constant in magnitude and changing in direction with the velocity, circular motion ensues. Taking two derivatives of the particle's coordinates concerning time gives the centripetal acceleration

$$a\, = \frac {v^2} {r} \, = {\omega^2} {r}$$

where:

- $v\,$ is the orbital velocity of the orbiting body,
- $r\,$ is radius of the circle
- $\omega \$ is angular speed, measured in radians per unit time.

The formula is dimensionless, describing a ratio true for all units of measure applied uniformly across the formula. If the numerical value $\mathbf{a}$ is measured in meters per second squared, then the numerical values $v\,$ will be in meters per second, $r\,$ in meters, and $\omega \$ in radians per second.

== Velocity ==
The speed (or the magnitude of velocity) relative to the centre of mass is constant:

$$v = \sqrt{ GM\! \over{r}} = \sqrt{\mu\over{r}}$$

where:

- $G$, is the gravitational constant
- $M$, is the mass of both orbiting bodies $(M_1+M_2)$, although in common practice, if the greater mass is significantly larger, the lesser mass is often neglected, with minimal change in the result.
- $\mu = GM$, is the standard gravitational parameter.
- $r$ is the distance from the center of mass.

== Equation of motion ==
The orbit equation in polar coordinates, which in general gives r in terms of θ, reduces to:

$$r={{h^2}\over{\mu}}$$

where:

- $h=rv$ is specific angular momentum of the orbiting body.

This is because $\mu=rv^2$

== Angular speed and orbital period ==
$$\omega^2 r^3=\mu$$

Hence the orbital period ($T\,\!$) can be computed as:

$$T=2\pi\sqrt{r^3\over{\mu}}$$

Compare two proportional quantities, the free-fall time (time to fall to a point mass from rest)

$T_\text{ff}=\frac{\pi}{2\sqrt{2}}\sqrt{r^3\over{\mu}}$ (17.7% of the orbital period in a circular orbit)

and the time to fall to a point mass in a radial parabolic orbit

$T_\text{par}=\frac{\sqrt{2}}{3}\sqrt{r^3\over{\mu}}$ (7.5% of the orbital period in a circular orbit)

The fact that the formulas only differ by a constant factor is a priori clear from dimensional analysis.

== Energy ==
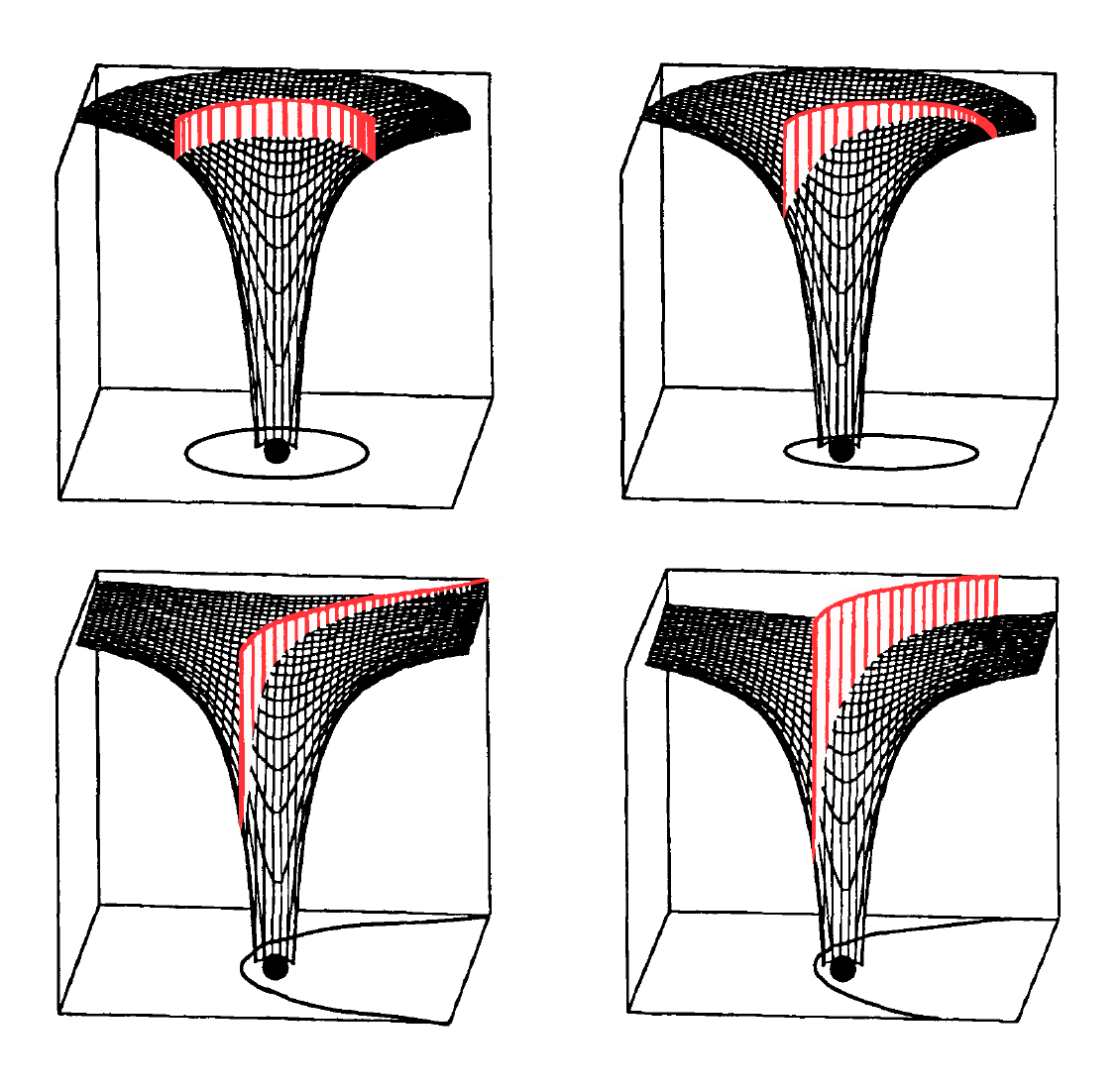
A circular orbit is depicted in the top-left quadrant of this diagram, where the gravitational potential well of the central mass shows potential energy, and the kinetic energy of the orbital speed is shown in red. The height of the kinetic energy remains constant throughout the constant speed circular orbit.

The specific orbital energy ($\epsilon\,$) is negative, and

$$\epsilon=-{v^2\over{2}}$$
$$\epsilon=-{\mu\over{2r}}$$

Thus the virial theorem applies even without taking a time-average:

- the kinetic energy of the system is equal to the absolute value of the total energy
- the potential energy of the system is equal to twice the total energy

The escape velocity from any distance is √2 times the speed in a circular orbit at that distance: the kinetic energy is twice as much, hence the total energy is zero.

== Delta-v to reach a circular orbit ==
Maneuvering into a large circular orbit, e.g. a geostationary orbit, requires a larger delta-v than an escape orbit, although the latter implies getting arbitrarily far away and having more energy than needed for the orbital speed of the circular orbit. It is also a matter of maneuvering into the orbit. See also Hohmann transfer orbit.

== Orbital velocity in general relativity ==
In Schwarzschild metric, the orbital velocity for a circular orbit with radius $r$ is given by the following formula:

$$v = \sqrt{\frac{GM}{r-r_S}}$$

where $\scriptstyle r_S = \frac{2GM}{c^2}$ is the Schwarzschild radius of the central body.

=== Derivation ===
For the sake of convenience, the derivation will be written in units in which $\scriptstyle c=G=1$.

The four-velocity of a body on a circular orbit is given by:

$$u^\mu = (\dot{t}, 0, 0, \dot{\phi})$$

($\scriptstyle r$ is constant on a circular orbit, and the coordinates can be chosen so that $\scriptstyle \theta=\frac{\pi}{2}$). The dot above a variable denotes derivation with respect to proper time $\scriptstyle \tau$.

For a massive particle, the components of the four-velocity satisfy the following equation:

$$\left(1-\frac{2M}{r}\right) \dot{t}^2 - r^2 \dot{\phi}^2 = 1$$

We use the geodesic equation:

$$\ddot{x}^\mu + \Gamma^\mu_{\nu\sigma}\dot{x}^\nu\dot{x}^\sigma = 0$$

The only nontrivial equation is the one for $\scriptstyle \mu = r$. It gives:

$$\frac{M}{r^2}\left(1-\frac{2M}{r}\right)\dot{t}^2 - r\left(1-\frac{2M}{r}\right)\dot{\phi}^2 = 0$$

From this, we get:

$$\dot{\phi}^2 = \frac{M}{r^3}\dot{t}^2$$

Substituting this into the equation for a massive particle gives:

$$\left(1-\frac{2M}{r}\right) \dot{t}^2 - \frac{M}{r} \dot{t}^2 = 1$$

Hence:

$$\dot{t}^2 = \frac{r}{r-3M}$$

Assume we have an observer at radius $\scriptstyle r$, who is not moving with respect to the central body, that is, their four-velocity is proportional to the vector $\scriptstyle \partial_t$. The normalization condition implies that it is equal to:

$$v^\mu = \left(\sqrt{\frac{r}{r-2M}},0,0,0\right)$$

The dot product of the four-velocities of the observer and the orbiting body equals the gamma factor for the orbiting body relative to the observer, hence:

$$\gamma = g_{\mu\nu}u^\mu v^\nu = \left(1-\frac{2M}{r}\right) \sqrt{\frac{r}{r-3M}} \sqrt{\frac{r}{r-2M}} = \sqrt{\frac{r-2M}{r-3M}}$$

This gives the velocity:

$$v = \sqrt{\frac{M}{r-2M}}$$

Or, in SI units:

$$v = \sqrt{\frac{GM}{r-r_S}}$$

At the top of the diagram, a satellite in a clockwise circular orbit (yellow spot) launches objects of negligible mass: (1 - blue) towards Earth, (2 - red) away from Earth, (3 - grey) in the direction of travel, and (4 - black) backwards in the direction of travel. Dashed ellipses are orbits relative to Earth. Solid curves are perturbations relative to the satellite: in one orbit, (1) and (2) return to the satellite having made a clockwise loop on either side of the satellite. Unintuitively, (3) spirals farther and farther behind whereas (4) spirals ahead.

== See also ==
- Elliptic orbit
- List of orbits
- Two-body problem
