= Hyperbolic trajectory =

Concept in astrodynamics

The blue path in this image is an example of a hyperbolic trajectory with an orbital eccentricity, e, greater than one

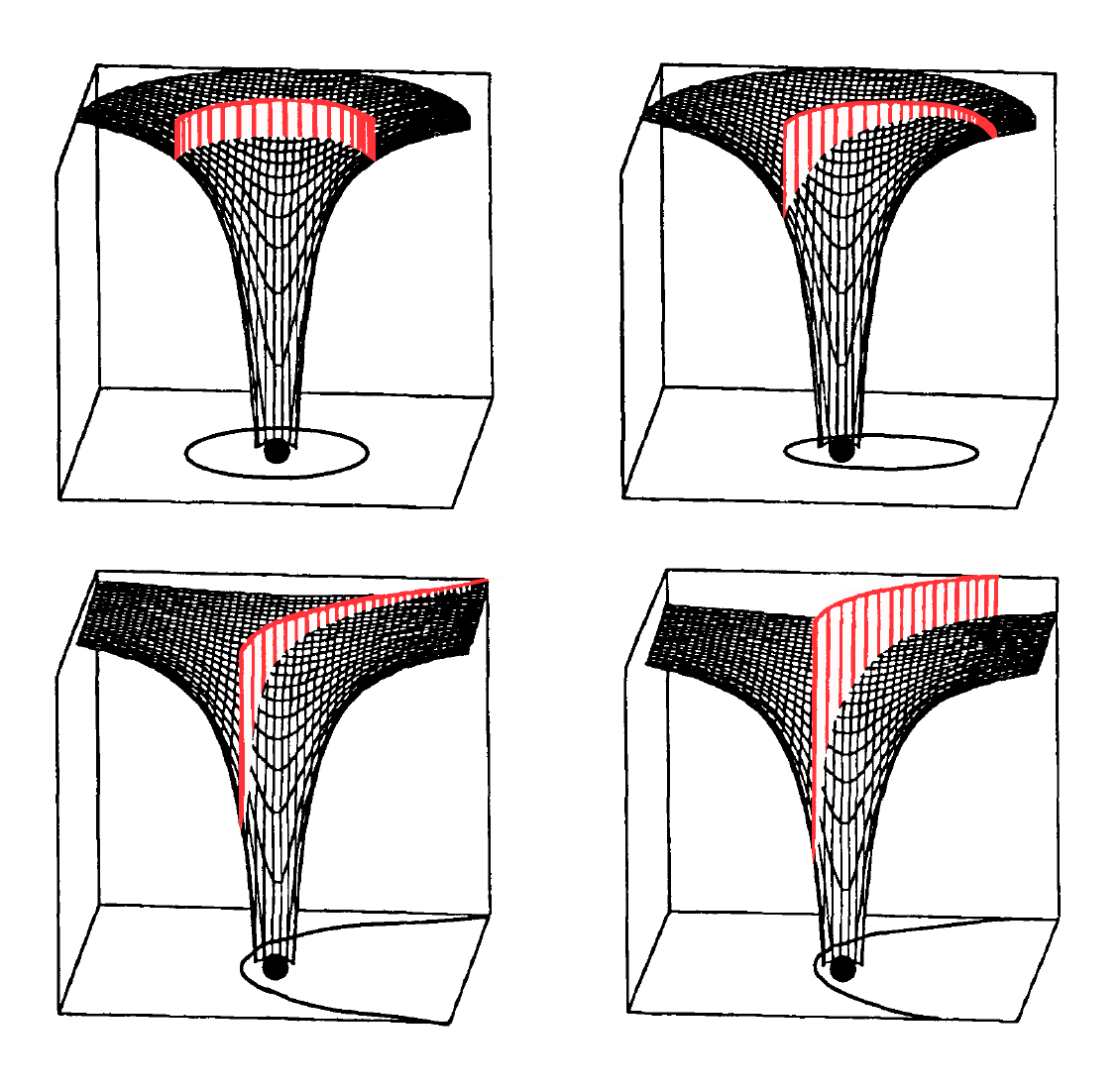
A hyperbolic trajectory is depicted in the bottom-right quadrant of this diagram, where the gravitational potential well of the central mass shows potential energy, and the kinetic energy of the hyperbolic trajectory is shown in red. The height of the kinetic energy decreases as the speed decreases and distance increases according to Kepler's laws. The part of the kinetic energy that remains above zero total energy is that associated with the hyperbolic excess velocity.

In astrodynamics or celestial mechanics, a hyperbolic trajectory or hyperbolic orbit (from Newtonian theory: hyperbola shape) is the trajectory of any object around a central body with enough velocity to escape the central object's gravitational field; expressed as orbital eccentricity designated by any number more than 1.

Under simplistic assumptions a body traveling along this trajectory will coast towards infinity, settling to a final excess velocity relative to the central body. As with parabolic trajectories, all hyperbolic trajectories are also escape trajectories. The specific energy of a hyperbolic trajectory orbit is positive.

Planetary flybys, used for gravitational slingshots, can be described within the planet's sphere of influence using hyperbolic trajectories.

== Parameters describing a hyperbolic trajectory ==
Like an elliptical orbit, a hyperbolic trajectory for a given system can be defined (ignoring orientation) by its semi major axis and the eccentricity. However, with a hyperbolic orbit other parameters may be more useful in understanding a body's motion. The following table lists the main parameters describing the path of body following a hyperbolic trajectory around another under standard assumptions and the formula connecting them.

Hyperbolic trajectory equations
Element	Symbol	Formula	using $v_\infty$ (or $a$), and $b$
Standard gravitational parameter	$\mu\,$	$\frac{v^2}{(2/r-1/a)}$	$b v_\infty^2 \cot \theta_\infty$
Eccentricity (>1)	$e$	$\frac{\ell}{r_p} -1$	$\sqrt{1+b^2/a^2}$
Semi-major axis (<0)	$a\,\!$	$1/(2/r-v^2/\mu)$	$-\mu/v_\infty^2$
Hyperbolic excess velocity	$v_\infty$	$\sqrt{-\mu/a}$	
(External) Angle between asymptotes	$2\theta_\infty$	$2 \cos^{-1}(-1/e)$	$2\pi + 2 \tan^{-1}(b/a)$
Angle between asymptotes and the conjugate axis of the hyperbolic path of approach	$2\nu$	$2\theta_\infty - \pi$	$2\sin^{-1}\bigg(\frac{1}{(1 + r_pv_\infty^2/\mu)}\bigg)$
Impact parameter (semi-minor axis)	$b$	$-a \sqrt{e^2-1}$	{\displaystyle }
Semi-latus rectum	$\ell$	$a (1-e^2)$	$-b^2/a = h^2/\mu$
Periapsis distance	$r_p$	$-a(e-1)$	$\sqrt{a^2+b^2}+a$
Specific orbital energy	$\varepsilon$	$-\mu/2a$	$v_\infty^2/2$
Specific angular momentum	$h$	$\sqrt{\mu \ell}$	$b v_\infty$
Area swept up per time	$\frac{\Delta A}{\Delta t}$	$\frac{h}{2}$	

=== Semi-major axis, energy and hyperbolic excess velocity ===
The semi major axis ($a\,\!$) is not immediately visible with a hyperbolic trajectory but can be constructed as it is the distance from periapsis to the point where the two asymptotes cross. Usually, by convention, it is negative, to keep various equations consistent with elliptical orbits.

The semi major axis is directly linked to the specific orbital energy ($\epsilon\,$) or characteristic energy $C_3$ of the orbit, and to the velocity the body attains at as the distance tends to infinity, the hyperbolic excess velocity ($v_\infty\,\!$).

$v_{\infty}^2=2\epsilon=C_3=-\mu/a$ or $a=-{\mu/{v_\infty^2}}$

where: $\mu=Gm\,\!$ is the standard gravitational parameter and $C_3$ is characteristic energy, commonly used in planning interplanetary missions

Note that the total energy is positive in the case of a hyperbolic trajectory (whereas it is negative for an elliptical orbit).

=== Eccentricity and angle between approach and departure ===
With a hyperbolic trajectory the orbital eccentricity is greater than 1. The eccentricity is directly related to the angle between the asymptotes. With eccentricity just over 1 the hyperbola is a sharp "v" shape. At $e=\sqrt 2$ the asymptotes are at right angles. With $e>2$ the asymptotes are more than 120° apart, and the periapsis distance is greater than the semi major axis. As eccentricity increases further the motion approaches a straight line.

The angle between the direction of periapsis and an asymptote from the central body is the true anomaly as distance tends to infinity ($\theta_\infty\,$), so $2\theta_\infty\,$ is the external angle between approach and departure directions (between asymptotes). Then

$\theta{_\infty}=\cos^{-1}(-1/e)\,$ or $e=-1/\cos\theta{_\infty}\,$

=== Impact parameter and the distance of closest approach ===
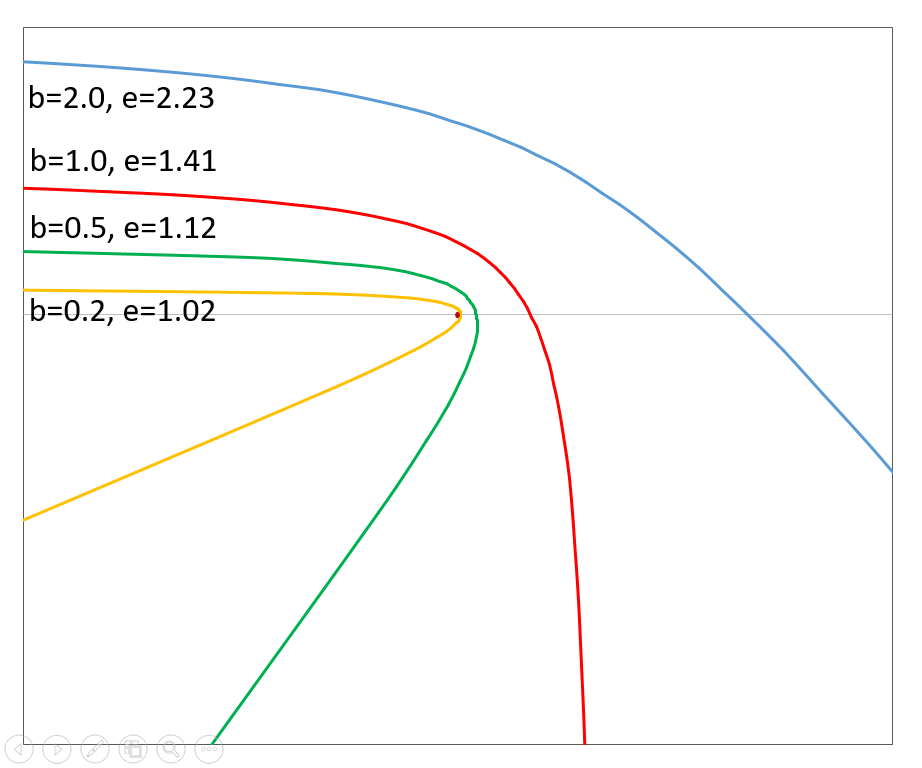
Hyperbolic trajectories followed by objects approaching central object (small dot) with same hyperbolic excess velocity (and semi-major axis (=1)) and from same direction but with different impact parameters and eccentricities. The yellow line indeed passes around the central dot, approaching it closely.

The impact parameter is the distance by which a body, if it continued on an unperturbed path, would miss the central body at its closest approach. With bodies experiencing gravitational forces and following hyperbolic trajectories it is equal to the semi-minor axis of the hyperbola.

In the situation of a spacecraft or comet approaching a planet, the impact parameter and excess velocity will be known accurately. If the central body is known the trajectory can now be found, including how close the approaching body will be at periapsis. If this is less than the planet's radius an impact should be expected. The distance of closest approach, or periapsis distance, is given by:

$$r_p = -a(e-1)= \frac{\mu}{v_\infty^2} \left(\sqrt{1 + \left(b \frac {v_\infty^2}{\mu}\right)^2} - 1\right)$$

So if a comet approaching Earth (effective radius ~6400 km) with a velocity of 12.5 km/s (the approximate minimum approach speed of a body coming from the outer Solar System) is to avoid a collision with Earth, the impact parameter will need to be at least 8600 km, or 34% more than the Earth's radius. A body approaching Jupiter (radius 70000 km) from the outer Solar System with a speed of 5.5 km/s, will need the impact parameter to be at least 770,000 km or 11 times Jupiter radius to avoid collision.

If the mass of the central body is not known, its standard gravitational parameter, and hence its mass, can be determined by the deflection of the smaller body together with the impact parameter and approach speed. Because typically all these variables can be determined accurately, a spacecraft flyby will provide a good estimate of a body's mass.

$\mu=b v_\infty^2 \tan \delta/2$ where $\delta = 2\theta_\infty - \pi$ is the angle the smaller body is deflected from a straight line in its course.

== Equations of motion ==
=== Position ===
In a hyperbolic trajectory the true anomaly $\theta$ is linked to the distance between the orbiting bodies ($r\,$) by the orbit equation:

$$r = \frac{\ell}{1 + e\cdot\cos\theta}$$

The relation between the true anomaly θ and the eccentric anomaly E (alternatively the hyperbolic anomaly H) is:

$\cosh{E} = {{\cos{\theta} + e} \over {1 + e \cdot \cos{\theta}}}$ or $\tan \frac{\theta}{2} = \sqrt{\frac{e+1}{e-1}} \cdot \tanh \frac{E}{2}$ or $\tanh \frac{E}{2} = \sqrt{\frac{e-1}{e+1}} \cdot \tan \frac{\theta}{2}$

The eccentric anomaly E is related to the mean anomaly M by Kepler's equation:

$$M = e \sinh E - E$$

The mean anomaly is proportional to time

$M=\sqrt{\frac{\mu}{-a^3}}.(t-\tau),$ where μ is a gravitational parameter and a is the semi-major axis of the orbit.

=== Flight path angle ===
The flight path angle (φ) is the angle between the direction of velocity and the perpendicular to the radial direction, so it is zero at periapsis and tends to 90 degrees at infinity.

$$\tan(\phi) = \frac{e\cdot\sin\theta}{1 + e\cdot \cos\theta}$$

=== Speed ===
Under standard assumptions the orbital speed ($v\,$) of a body traveling along a hyperbolic trajectory can be computed from the vis-viva equation as:

$v=\sqrt{\mu\left({2\over{r}}+{1\over{a}}\right)}$

where:

- $\mu\,$ is standard gravitational parameter,
- $r\,$ is radial distance of orbiting body from central body,
- $a\,\!$ is the absolute value (distance) of the semi-major axis.

Under standard assumptions, at any position in the orbit the following relation holds for orbital velocity ($v\,$), local escape velocity (${v_{esc}}\,$) and hyperbolic excess velocity ($v_\infty\,\!$):

$$v^2={v_{esc}}^2+{v_\infty}^2$$

Note that this means that a relatively small extra delta-v above that needed to accelerate to the escape speed results in a relatively large speed at infinity. For example, at a place where escape speed is 11.2 km/s, the addition of 0.4 km/s yields a hyperbolic excess speed of 3.02 km/s.

$$\sqrt{11.6^2-11.2^2}=3.02$$

This is an example of the Oberth effect. The converse is also true - a body does not need to be slowed by much compared to its hyperbolic excess speed (e.g. by atmospheric drag near periapsis) for velocity to fall below escape velocity and so for the body to be captured.

== Radial hyperbolic trajectory ==
A radial hyperbolic trajectory is a non-periodic trajectory on a straight line where the relative speed of the two objects always exceeds the escape velocity. There are two cases: the bodies move away from each other or towards each other. This is a hyperbolic orbit with semi-minor axis = 0 and eccentricity = 1. Although the eccentricity is 1 this is not a parabolic orbit.

== Deflection with finite sphere of influence ==
A more accurate formula for the deflection angle $\delta$ considering the sphere of influence radius $R_\text{SOI}$ of the deflecting body, assuming a periapsis $p_e$ is:

$$\delta = 2\arcsin\left( \frac{\sqrt{1 - \frac{p_e}{R_\text{SOI}}} \sqrt{1 + \frac{p_e}{R_\text{SOI}} - \frac{2 \mu p_e}{v_{\infty}^2 R_\text{SOI}^2}}}{1 + \frac{v_{\infty}^2 p_e}{\mu} - \frac{2 p_e}{R_\text{SOI}}} \right)$$

== Relativistic two-body problem ==
In context of the two-body problem in general relativity, trajectories of objects with enough energy to escape the gravitational pull of the other no longer are shaped like a hyperbola. Nonetheless, the term "hyperbolic trajectory" is still used to describe orbits of this type.

== See also ==
- Orbit
- Orbit equation
- Kepler orbit
- List of orbits
- Planetary flyby
- Hyperbolic asteroid
- List of hyperbolic comets
