= Parabolic trajectory =

Type of orbit

The green path in this image is an example of a parabolic trajectory.

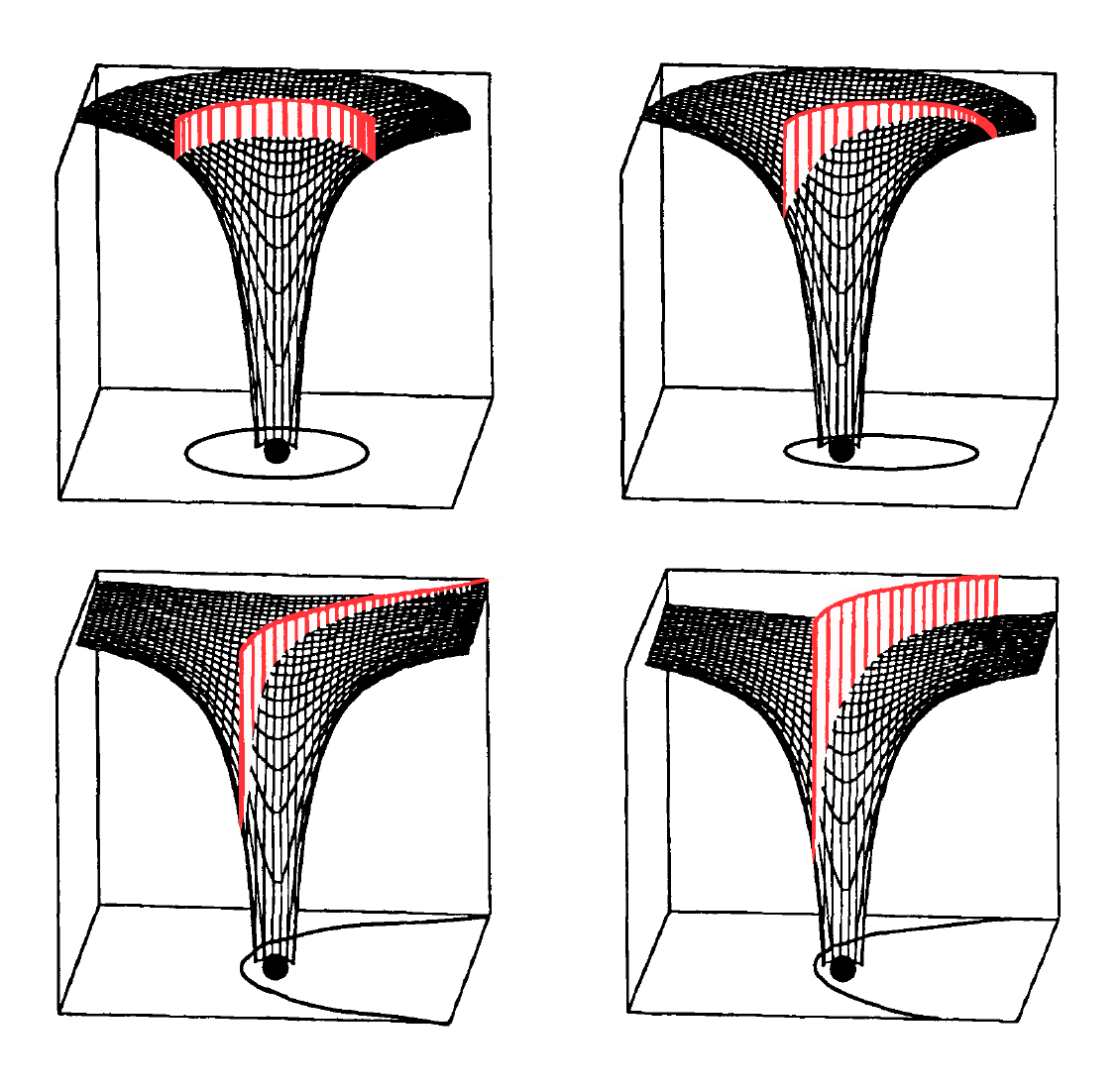
A parabolic trajectory is depicted in the bottom-left quadrant of this diagram, where the gravitational potential well of the central mass shows potential energy, and the kinetic energy of the parabolic trajectory is shown in red. The height of the kinetic energy decreases asymptotically toward zero as the speed decreases and distance increases according to Kepler's laws.

In astrodynamics or celestial mechanics a parabolic trajectory is a Kepler orbit with the eccentricity (e) equal to 1 and is an unbound orbit that is exactly on the border between elliptical and hyperbolic. When moving away from the source it is called an escape orbit, otherwise a capture orbit. It is also sometimes referred to as a $C_{3} = 0$ orbit (see characteristic energy).

Under standard assumptions a body traveling along an escape orbit will coast along a parabolic trajectory to infinity, with velocity relative to the central body tending to zero, and therefore will never return. Parabolic trajectories are minimum-energy escape trajectories, separating positive-energy hyperbolic trajectories from negative-energy elliptic orbits.

== History ==
In 1609, Galileo wrote in his 102nd folio (MS. Gal 72) about parabolic trajectory calculations, later found in Discorsi e dimostrazioni matematiche intorno a due nuove scienze as projectiles impetus.

== Velocity ==
The orbital velocity ($v$) of a body travelling along a parabolic trajectory can be computed as:
$$v = \sqrt{2\mu \over r}$$
where:

- $r$ is the radial distance of the orbiting body from the central body,
- $\mu$ is the standard gravitational parameter.

At any position the orbiting body has the escape velocity for that position.

If a body has an escape velocity with respect to the Earth, this is not enough to escape the Solar System, so near the Earth the orbit resembles a parabola, but further away it bends into an elliptical orbit around the Sun.

This velocity ($v$) is closely related to the orbital velocity of a body in a circular orbit of the radius equal to the radial position of orbiting body on the parabolic trajectory:
$$v = \sqrt{2}\, v_o$$
where:

- $v_o$ is orbital velocity of a body in circular orbit.

== Equation of motion ==
For a body moving along this kind of trajectory the orbital equation is:
$$r = {h^2 \over \mu}{1 \over {1 + \cos\nu}}$$
where:

- $r\,$ is the radial distance of the orbiting body from the central body,
- $h\,$ is the specific angular momentum of the orbiting body,
- $\nu\,$ is the true anomaly of the orbiting body,
- $\mu\,$ is the standard gravitational parameter.

== Energy ==
Under standard assumptions, the specific orbital energy ($\epsilon$) of a parabolic trajectory is zero, so the orbital energy conservation equation for this trajectory takes the form:
$$\epsilon = {v^2 \over 2} - {\mu \over r} = 0$$
where:

- $v\,$ is the orbital velocity of the orbiting body,
- $r\,$ is the radial distance of the orbiting body from the central body,
- $\mu\,$ is the standard gravitational parameter.

This is entirely equivalent to the characteristic energy (square of the speed at infinity) being 0:
$$C_3 = 0$$

== Barker's equation ==
Barker's equation relates the time of flight $t$ to the true anomaly $\nu$ of a parabolic trajectory:
$$t - T = \frac{1}{2} \sqrt{\frac{p^3}{\mu}} \left(D + \frac{1}{3} D^3 \right)$$
where:

- $D = \tan \frac{\nu}{2}$ is an auxiliary variable
- $T$ is the time of periapsis passage
- $\mu$ is the standard gravitational parameter
- $p$ is the semi-latus rectum of the trajectory, given by $p = h^2/\mu$

More generally, the time (epoch) between any two points on an orbit is
$$t_f - t_0 = \frac{1}{2} \sqrt{\frac{p^3}{\mu}} \left(D_f + \frac{1}{3} D_f^3 - D_0 - \frac{1}{3} D_0^3\right)$$

Alternately, the equation can be expressed in terms of periapsis distance, in a parabolic orbit $r_p = p/2$:
$$t - T = \sqrt{\frac{2 r_p^3}{\mu}} \left(D + \frac{1}{3} D^3\right)$$

Unlike Kepler's equation, which is used to solve for true anomalies in elliptical and hyperbolic trajectories, the true anomaly in Barker's equation can be solved directly for $t$. If the following substitutions are made
$$\begin{align}
A &= \frac{3}{2} \sqrt{\frac{\mu}{2r_p^3}} (t - T) \\[3pt]
B &= \sqrt[3]{A + \sqrt{A^{2}+1}}
\end{align}$$
then
$$\nu = 2\arctan\left(B - \frac{1}{B}\right)$$

With hyperbolic functions the solution can be also expressed as:
$$\nu = 2\arctan\left(2\sinh\frac{\mathrm{arcsinh} \frac{3M}{2}}{3}\right)$$
where
$$M = \sqrt{\frac{\mu}{2r_p^3}} (t - T)$$

== Radial parabolic trajectory ==
A radial parabolic trajectory is a non-periodic trajectory on a straight line where the relative velocity of the two objects is always the escape velocity. There are two cases: the bodies move away from each other or towards each other.

There is a rather simple expression for the position as function of time:
$$r = \sqrt[3]{\frac{9}{2} \mu t^2}$$
where

- $\mu$ is the standard gravitational parameter
- $t = 0\!\,$ corresponds to the extrapolated time of the fictitious starting or ending at the center of the central body.

At any time the average speed from $t = 0\!\,$ is 1.5 times the current speed, i.e. 1.5 times the local escape velocity.

To have $t = 0\!\,$ at the surface, apply a time shift; for the Earth (and any other spherically symmetric body with the same average density) as central body this time shift is 6 minutes and 20 seconds; seven of these periods later the height above the surface is three times the radius, etc.

== See also ==
- Kepler orbit
- Parabola
