= Orbital speed =

Speed at which a body orbits around the barycenter of a system

In gravitationally bound systems, the orbital speed of an astronomical body or object (e.g. planet, moon, artificial satellite, spacecraft, or star) is the speed at which it orbits around either the barycenter (the combined center of mass) or, if one body is much more massive than the other bodies of the system combined, its speed relative to the center of mass of the most massive body.

The term can be used to refer to either the mean orbital speed (i.e. the average speed over an entire orbit) or its instantaneous speed at a particular point in its orbit. The maximum (instantaneous) orbital speed occurs at periapsis (perigee, perihelion, etc.), while the minimum speed for objects in closed orbits occurs at apoapsis (apogee, aphelion, etc.). In ideal two-body systems, objects in open orbits continue to slow down forever as their distance to the barycenter increases.

When a system approximates a two-body system, instantaneous orbital speed at a given point of the orbit can be computed from its distance to the central body and the object's specific orbital energy, sometimes called "total energy". Specific orbital energy is constant and independent of position.

== Radial trajectories ==
In the following, it is assumed that the system is a two-body system and the orbiting object has a negligible mass compared to the larger (central) object. In real-world orbital mechanics, it is the system's barycenter, not the larger object, which is at the focus.

Specific orbital energy, or total energy, is equal to E_{k} − E_{p} (the difference between kinetic energy and potential energy). The sign of the result may be positive, zero, or negative and the sign tells us something about the type of orbit:

- If the specific orbital energy is positive the orbit is unbound, or open, and will follow a hyperbola with the larger body the focus of the hyperbola. Objects in open orbits do not return; once past periapsis their distance from the focus increases without bound. See radial hyperbolic trajectory
- If the total energy is zero, (E_{k} = E_{p}): the orbit is a parabola with focus at the other body. See radial parabolic trajectory. Parabolic orbits are also open.
- If the total energy is negative, E_{k} − E_{p} < 0: The orbit is bound, or closed. The motion will be on an ellipse with one focus at the other body. See radial elliptic trajectory, free-fall time. Planets have bound orbits around the Sun.

== Transverse orbital speed ==
The transverse orbital speed is inversely proportional to the distance to the central body because of the law of conservation of angular momentum, or equivalently, Kepler's second law. This states that as a body moves around its orbit during a fixed amount of time, the line from the barycenter to the body sweeps a constant area of the orbital plane, regardless of which part of its orbit the body traces during that period of time.

This law implies that the body moves slower near its apoapsis than near its periapsis, because at the smaller distance along the arc it needs to move faster to cover the same area.

== Mean orbital speed ==
For orbits with small eccentricity, the length of the orbit is close to that of a circular one, and the mean orbital speed can be approximated either from observations of the orbital period and the semimajor axis of its orbit, or from knowledge of the masses of the two bodies and the semimajor axis.

$$v \approx {2 \pi a \over T}  \approx \sqrt{\mu \over a}$$

where v is the orbital velocity, a is the length of the semimajor axis, T is the orbital period, and μ = GM is the standard gravitational parameter. This is an approximation that only holds true when the orbiting body is of considerably lesser mass than the central one, and eccentricity is close to zero.

When one of the bodies is not of considerably lesser mass see: Gravitational two-body problem

So, when one of the masses is almost negligible compared to the other mass, as the case for Earth and Sun, one can approximate the orbit velocity $v_o$ as:

$$v_o \approx \sqrt{\frac{GM}{r}}$$

or:

$$v_o \approx \frac{v_e}{\sqrt{2}}$$

Where M is the (greater) mass around which this negligible mass or body is orbiting, and v_{e} is the escape velocity at a distance from the center of the primary body equal to the radius of the orbit.

For an object in an eccentric orbit orbiting a much larger body, the length of the orbit decreases with orbital eccentricity e, and is an ellipse. This can be used to obtain a more accurate estimate of the average orbital speed:

$$v_o = \frac{2\pi a}{T}\left[1-\frac{1}{4}e^2-\frac{3}{64}e^4 -\frac{5}{256}e^6 -\frac{175}{16384}e^8 - \cdots \right]$$

The mean orbital speed decreases with eccentricity.

== Instantaneous orbital speed ==
For the instantaneous orbital speed of a body at any given point in its trajectory, both the mean distance and the instantaneous distance are taken into account:

$$v = \sqrt {\mu \left({2 \over r} - {1 \over a}\right)}$$

where μ is the standard gravitational parameter of the orbited body, r is the distance at which the speed is to be calculated, and a is the length of the semi-major axis of the elliptical orbit. This expression is called the vis-viva equation.

For the Earth at perihelion, the value is:

$$\sqrt {1.327 \times 10^{20} ~\text{m}^3 \text{s}^{-2} \cdot \left({2 \over 1.471 \times 10^{11} ~\text{m}} - {1 \over 1.496 \times 10^{11} ~\text{m}}\right)} \approx 30,300 ~\text{m}/\text{s}$$

which is slightly faster than Earth's average orbital speed of 29,800 m/s (67,000 mph), as expected from Kepler's 2nd Law.

== Tangential velocities at altitude ==
Orbit	Center-to-center distance	Altitude above the Earth's surface	Speed	Orbital period	Specific orbital energy
Earth's own rotation at surface on the equator (for comparison; not an orbit)	6,378 km	0 km	465.1 m/s (1,674 km/h or 1,040 mph)	23 h 56 min 4.09 sec	−62.6 MJ/kg
Orbiting at Earth's surface (equator) theoretical	6,378 km	0 km	7.9 km/s (28,440 km/h or 17,672 mph)	1 h 24 min 18 sec	−31.2 MJ/kg
Low Earth orbit	6,600 – 8,400 km	200 – 2,000 km	Circular orbit: 7.7–6.9 km/s (27,720–24,840 km/h or 17,224–15,435 mph) respectively; Elliptic: 10.07–8.7 km/s respectively	1 h 29 min – 2 h 8 min	−29.8 MJ/kg
Molniya orbit	6,900 – 46,300 km	500 – 39,900 km	1.5–10.0 km/s (5,400–36,000 km/h or 3,335–22,370 mph) respectively	11 h 58 min	−4.7 MJ/kg
Geostationary	42,000 km	35,786 km	3.075 km/s (11,070 km/h or 6,879 mph)	23 h 56 min 4.09 sec	−4.6 MJ/kg
Orbit of the Moon	363,000 – 406,000 km	357,000 – 399,000 km	0.97–1.08 km/s (3,492–3,888 km/h or 2,170–2,416 mph) respectively	27.27 days	−0.5 MJ/kg

The lower axis gives orbital speeds of some orbits.

== Planets ==
The closer an object is to the Sun the faster it needs to move to maintain the orbit. Objects move fastest at perihelion (closest approach to the Sun) and slowest at aphelion (furthest distance from the Sun). Since planets in the Solar System are in nearly circular orbits their individual orbital velocities do not vary much. Being closest to the Sun and having the most eccentric orbit, Mercury's orbital speed varies from about 59 km/s at perihelion to 39 km/s at aphelion.

Orbital periods and velocities of the planets
Planet	Orbital period (days)	Orbital period (Earth years)	Orbital velocity
Mercury	87.969	0.241	47.9 km/s (29.8 mi/s)
Venus	224.701	0.615	35.0 km/s (21.7 mi/s)
Earth	365.256	1.000	29.8 km/s (18.5 mi/s)
Mars	686.980	1.881	24.1 km/s (15.0 mi/s)
Jupiter	4,332.589	11.862	13.1 km/s (8.1 mi/s)
Saturn	10,759.22	29.457	9.7 km/s (6.0 mi/s)
Uranus	30,688.5	84.020	6.8 km/s (4.2 mi/s)
Neptune	60,182	164.8	5.4 km/s (3.4 mi/s)

Halley's Comet on an eccentric orbit that reaches beyond Neptune will be moving 54.6 km/s when 0.586 AU (87,700 thousand km) from the Sun, 41.5 km/s when 1 AU from the Sun (passing Earth's orbit), and roughly 1 km/s at aphelion 35 AU (5.2 billion km) from the Sun. Objects passing Earth's orbit going faster than 42.1 km/s have achieved escape velocity and will be ejected from the Solar System if not slowed down by a gravitational interaction with a planet.

Velocities of better-known numbered objects that have perihelion close to the Sun
Object	Velocity at perihelion	Velocity at 1 AU (passing Earth's orbit)
322P/SOHO	181 km/s @ 0.0537 AU	37.7 km/s
96P/Machholz	118 km/s @ 0.124 AU	38.5 km/s
3200 Phaethon	109 km/s @ 0.140 AU	32.7 km/s
1566 Icarus	93.1 km/s @ 0.187 AU	30.9 km/s
66391 Moshup	86.5 km/s @ 0.200 AU	19.8 km/s
1P/Halley	54.6 km/s @ 0.586 AU	41.5 km/s

== See also ==
- Escape velocity
- Delta-v budget
- Hohmann transfer orbit
- Bi-elliptic transfer
