= Characteristic energy =

Measure in astrodynamics

In astrodynamics, the characteristic energy ($C_3$) is a measure of the excess specific energy over that required to just barely escape from a massive body. The units are length^{2} time^{−2}, i.e. velocity squared, or energy per mass.

Every object in a 2-body ballistic trajectory has a constant specific orbital energy $\epsilon$ equal to the sum of its specific kinetic and specific potential energy:
$$\epsilon = \frac{1}{2} v^2 - \frac{\mu}{r} = \text{constant} = \frac{1}{2} C_3,$$
where $\mu = GM$ is the standard gravitational parameter of the massive body with mass $M$, and $r$ is the radial distance from its center. As an object in an escape trajectory moves outward, its kinetic energy decreases as its potential energy (which is always negative) increases, maintaining a constant sum.

Note that C_{3} is twice the specific orbital energy $\epsilon$ of the escaping object.

== Non-escape trajectory ==
A spacecraft with insufficient energy to escape will remain in a closed orbit (unless it intersects the central body), with
$$C_3 = -\frac{\mu}{a} < 0$$
where

- $\mu = GM$ is the standard gravitational parameter,
- $a$ is the semi-major axis of the orbit's ellipse.

If the orbit is circular, of radius r, then
$$C_3 = -\frac{\mu}{r}$$

== Parabolic trajectory ==
A spacecraft leaving the central body on a parabolic trajectory has exactly the energy needed to escape and no more:
$$C_3 = 0$$

== Hyperbolic trajectory ==
A spacecraft that is leaving the central body on a hyperbolic trajectory has more than enough energy to escape:
$$C_3 = \frac{\mu}{|a|} > 0$$
where

- $\mu = GM$ is the standard gravitational parameter,
- $a$ is the semi-major axis of the orbit's hyperbola (which may be negative in some convention).

Also,
$$C_3 = v_\infty^2$$
where $v_\infty$ is the asymptotic velocity at infinite distance. Spacecraft's velocity approaches $v_\infty$ as it is further away from the central object's gravity.

== History of the notation ==
According to Chauncey Uphoff, the ultimate source of the notation C_{3} is Forest Ray Moulton's textbook An Introduction to Celestial Mechanics. In the second edition (1914) of this book, Moulton solves the problem of the motion of two bodies under an attractive gravitational force in chapter 5. After reducing the problem to the relative motion of the bodies in the plane, he defines the constant of the motion c_{3} by the equation

ẋ^{2} + ẏ^{2} = 2k^{2} M/r + c_{3},

where M is the total mass of the two bodies and k^{2} is Moulton's notation for the gravitational constant. He defines c_{1}, c_{2}, and c_{4} to be other constants of the motion. The notation C_{3} probably became popularized via the JPL technical report TR-32-30 ("Design of Lunar and Interplanetary Ascent Trajectories", Victor C. Clarke, Jr., March 15, 1962), which used Moulton's terminology.

== Examples ==
MAVEN, a Mars-bound spacecraft, was launched into a trajectory with a characteristic energy of 12.2 km^{2}/s^{2} with respect to the Earth. When simplified to a two-body problem, this would mean the MAVEN escaped Earth on a hyperbolic trajectory slowly decreasing its speed towards $\sqrt{12.2}\text{ km/s} = 3.5\text{ km/s}$. However, since the Sun's gravitational field is much stronger than Earth's, the two-body solution is insufficient. The characteristic energy with respect to Sun was negative, and MAVEN – instead of heading to infinity – entered an elliptical orbit around the Sun. But the maximal velocity on the new orbit could be approximated to 33.5 km/s by assuming that it reached practical "infinity" at 3.5 km/s and that such Earth-bound "infinity" also moves with Earth's orbital velocity of about 30 km/s.

The InSight mission to Mars launched with a C_{3} of 8.19 km^{2}/s^{2}. The Parker Solar Probe (via Venus) plans a maximum C_{3} of 154 km^{2}/s^{2}.

Typical ballistic C_{3} (km^{2}/s^{2}) to get from Earth to various planets: Mars 8-16, Jupiter 80, Saturn or Uranus 147. To Pluto (with its orbital inclination) needs about 160–164 km^{2}/s^{2}.

== See also ==
- Specific orbital energy
- Orbit
- Parabolic trajectory
- Hyperbolic trajectory
