= Eccentricity vector =

Vector in celestial mechanics

In celestial mechanics, the eccentricity vector of a Kepler orbit is the dimensionless vector with direction pointing from apoapsis to periapsis and with magnitude equal to the orbit's scalar eccentricity. For Kepler orbits the eccentricity vector is a constant of motion. Its main use is in the analysis of almost circular orbits, as perturbing (non-Keplerian) forces on an actual orbit will cause the osculating eccentricity vector to change continuously as opposed to the eccentricity and argument of periapsis parameters for which eccentricity zero (circular orbit) corresponds to a singularity.

== Calculation ==
The eccentricity vector $\mathbf{e}$ is:
$$\mathbf{e} = {\mathbf{v}\times\mathbf{h}\over{\mu}} - {\mathbf{r}\over{\left|\mathbf{r}\right|}} =
\left ( {\mathbf{\left |v \right |}^2 \over {\mu} }- {1 \over{\left|\mathbf{r}\right|}} \right ) \mathbf{r} - {\mathbf{r} \cdot \mathbf{v} \over{\mu}} \mathbf{v}$$
which follows immediately from the vector identity:
$$\mathbf{v}\times \left ( \mathbf{r}\times \mathbf{v} \right ) = \left ( \mathbf{v} \cdot \mathbf{v} \right ) \mathbf{r} - \left ( \mathbf{r} \cdot \mathbf{v} \right ) \mathbf{v}$$
where:

- $\mathbf{r}\,\!$ is the position vector
- $\mathbf{v}\,\!$ is the velocity vector
- $\mathbf{h}\,\!$ is the specific angular momentum vector (equal to $\mathbf{r}\times\mathbf{v}$)
- $\mu\,\!$ is the standard gravitational parameter

== See also ==
- Kepler orbit
- Orbit
- Eccentricity
- Laplace–Runge–Lenz vector
