= Specific orbital energy =

Parameter in the gravitational two-body problem

In the gravitational two-body problem, the specific orbital energy $\varepsilon$ (or specific vis-viva energy) of two orbiting bodies is the constant quotient of their mechanical energy (the sum of their mutual potential energy, $\varepsilon_p$, and their kinetic energy, $\varepsilon_k$) to their reduced mass.

According to the orbital energy conservation equation (also referred to as vis-viva equation), it does not vary with time:
$$\begin{align}
\varepsilon &=  \varepsilon_k + \varepsilon_p \\
&=  \frac{v^2}{2} - \frac{\mu}{r}
= -\frac{1}{2} \frac{\mu^2}{h^2} \left(1 - e^2\right)
= -\frac{\mu}{2a}
\end{align}$$
where

- $v$ is the relative orbital speed;
- $r$ is the orbital distance between the bodies;
- $\mu = {G}(m_1 + m_2)$ is the sum of the standard gravitational parameters of the bodies;
- $h$ is the specific relative angular momentum in the sense of relative angular momentum divided by the reduced mass;
- $e$ is the orbital eccentricity;
- $a$ is the semi-major axis.

It is a kind of specific energy, typically expressed in units of $\frac{\text{MJ}}{\text{kg}}$ (megajoule per kilogram) or $\frac{\text{km}^2}{\text{s}^2}$ (squared kilometer per squared second). For an elliptic orbit the specific orbital energy is the negative of the additional energy required to accelerate a mass of one kilogram to escape velocity (parabolic orbit). For a hyperbolic orbit, it is equal to the excess energy compared to that of a parabolic orbit. In this case the specific orbital energy is also referred to as characteristic energy.

== Equation forms for different orbits ==
For an elliptic orbit, the specific orbital energy equation, when combined with conservation of specific angular momentum at one of the orbit's apsides, simplifies to:

$\varepsilon = -\frac{\mu}{2a}$ where

- $\mu = G\left(m_1 + m_2\right)$ is the standard gravitational parameter;
- $a$ is semi-major axis of the orbit.
Proof

For an elliptic orbit with specific angular momentum h given by $h^2 = \mu p = \mu a \left(1 - e^2\right)$ we use the general form of the specific orbital energy equation, $\varepsilon = \frac{v^2}{2} - \frac{\mu}{r}$ with the relation that the relative velocity at periapsis is $v_p^2 = {h^2 \over r_p^2} = {h^2 \over a^2(1 - e)^2} = {\mu a \left(1 - e^2\right) \over a^2(1 - e)^2} = {\mu \left(1 - e^2\right) \over a(1 - e)^2}$ Thus our specific orbital energy equation becomes $\varepsilon = \frac{\mu}{a} {\left[ { 1 - e^2 \over 2(1 - e)^2} - {1 \over 1 - e} \right]} = \frac{\mu}{a} {\left[ {(1 - e)(1 + e) \over 2(1 - e)^2} - {1 \over 1 - e} \right]} = \frac{\mu}{a} {\left[ { 1 + e \over 2(1 - e)} - {2 \over 2(1 - e)} \right]} = \frac{\mu}{a} {\left[ { e - 1 \over 2(1 - e)} \right]}$ and finally with the last simplification we obtain: $\varepsilon = -{\mu \over 2a}$

For a parabolic orbit this equation simplifies to $\varepsilon = 0.$

For a hyperbolic trajectory this specific orbital energy is either given by $\varepsilon = {\mu \over 2a}.$

or the same as for an ellipse, depending on the convention for the sign of a.

In this case the specific orbital energy is also referred to as characteristic energy (or $C_3$) and is equal to the excess specific energy compared to that for a parabolic orbit.

It is related to the hyperbolic excess velocity $v_\infty$ (the orbital velocity at infinity) by $2\varepsilon = C_3 = v_\infty^2.$

It is relevant for interplanetary missions.

Thus, if orbital position vector ($\mathbf{r}$) and orbital velocity vector ($\mathbf{v}$) are known at one position, and $\mu$ is known, then the energy can be computed and from that, for any other position, the orbital speed.

== Rate of change ==
For an elliptic orbit the rate of change of the specific orbital energy with respect to a change in the semi-major axis is $\frac{\mu}{2a^2}$ where

- $\mu={G}(m_1 + m_2)$ is the standard gravitational parameter;
- $a\,\!$ is semi-major axis of the orbit.

In the case of circular orbits, this rate is one half of the gravitation at the orbit. This corresponds to the fact that for such orbits the total energy is one half of the potential energy, because the kinetic energy is minus one half of the potential energy.

== Additional energy ==
If the central body has radius R, then the additional specific energy of an elliptic orbit compared to being stationary at the surface is

$-\frac{\mu}{2a}+\frac{\mu}{R} = \frac{\mu(2a-R)}{2aR}$

The quantity $2a-R$ is the height the ellipse extends above the surface, plus the periapsis distance (the distance the ellipse extends beyond the center of the Earth). For the Earth and $a$ just little more than $R$ the additional specific energy is $(gR/2)$; which is the kinetic energy of the horizontal component of the velocity, i.e. $\frac{1}{2}V^2 = \frac{1}{2}gR$, $V=\sqrt{gR}$.

== Examples ==
=== ISS ===
The International Space Station has an orbital period of 91.74 minutes (5504 s), hence by Kepler's Third Law the semi-major axis of its orbit is 6,738 km.

The specific orbital energy associated with this orbit is −29.6 MJ/kg: the potential energy is −59.2 MJ/kg, and the kinetic energy 29.6 MJ/kg. Compared with the potential energy at the surface, which is −62.6 MJ/kg., the extra potential energy is 3.4 MJ/kg, and the total extra energy is 33.0 MJ/kg. The average speed is 7.7 km/s, the net delta-v to reach this orbit is 8.1 km/s (the actual delta-v is typically 1.5–2.0 km/s more for atmospheric drag and gravity drag).

The increase per meter would be 4.4 J/kg; this rate corresponds to one half of the local gravity of 8.8 m/s^{2}.

For an altitude of 100 km (radius is 6471 km):

The energy is −30.8 MJ/kg: the potential energy is −61.6 MJ/kg, and the kinetic energy 30.8 MJ/kg. Compare with the potential energy at the surface, which is −62.6 MJ/kg. The extra potential energy is 1.0 MJ/kg, the total extra energy is 31.8 MJ/kg.

The increase per meter would be 4.8 J/kg; this rate corresponds to one half of the local gravity of 9.5 m/s^{2}. The speed is 7.8 km/s, the net delta-v to reach this orbit is 8.0 km/s.

Taking into account the rotation of the Earth, the delta-v is up to 0.46 km/s less (starting at the equator and going east) or more (if going west).

=== Voyager 1 ===
For Voyager 1, with respect to the Sun:

- $\mu = GM$ = 132,712,440,018 km^{3}⋅s^{−2} is the standard gravitational parameter of the Sun
- r = 17 billion kilometers
- v = 17.1 km/s

Hence: $\varepsilon = \varepsilon_k + \varepsilon_p = \frac{v^2}{2} - \frac{\mu}{r} = \mathrm{146\,km^2 s^{-2}} - \mathrm{8\, km^2 s^{-2}} = \mathrm{138\,km^2 s^{-2}}$

Thus the hyperbolic excess velocity (the theoretical orbital velocity at infinity) is given by $v_\infty = \mathrm{16.6\,km/s}$

However, Voyager 1 does not have enough velocity to leave the Milky Way. The computed speed applies far away from the Sun, but at such a position that the potential energy with respect to the Milky Way as a whole has changed negligibly, and only if there is no strong interaction with celestial bodies other than the Sun.

== Applying thrust ==
Assume:

- a is the acceleration due to thrust (the time-rate at which delta-v is spent)
- g is the gravitational field strength
- v is the velocity of the rocket

Then the time-rate of change of the specific energy of the rocket is $\mathbf{v} \cdot \mathbf{a}$: an amount $\mathbf{v} \cdot (\mathbf{a}-\mathbf{g})$ for the kinetic energy and an amount $\mathbf{v} \cdot \mathbf{g}$ for the potential energy.

The change of the specific energy of the rocket per unit change of delta-v is $\frac{\mathbf{v \cdot a}}{|\mathbf{a}|}$ which is |v| times the cosine of the angle between v and a.

Thus, when applying delta-v to increase specific orbital energy, this is done most efficiently if a is applied in the direction of v, and when |v| is large. If the angle between v and g is obtuse, for example in a launch and in a transfer to a higher orbit, this means applying the delta-v as early as possible and at full capacity. See also gravity drag. When passing by a celestial body it means applying thrust when nearest to the body. When gradually making an elliptic orbit larger, it means applying thrust each time when near the periapsis. Such maneuver is called an Oberth maneuver or powered flyby.

When applying delta-v to decrease specific orbital energy, this is done most efficiently if a is applied in the direction opposite to that of v, and again when |v| is large. If the angle between v and g is acute, for example in a landing (on a celestial body without atmosphere) and in a transfer to a circular orbit around a celestial body when arriving from outside, this means applying the delta-v as late as possible. When passing by a planet it means applying thrust when nearest to the planet. When gradually making an elliptic orbit smaller, it means applying thrust each time when near the periapsis.

If a is in the direction of v: $\Delta \varepsilon = \int v\, d (\Delta v) = \int v\, a dt$

== Tangential velocities at altitude ==
Orbit	Center-to-center distance	Altitude above the Earth's surface	Speed	Orbital period	Specific orbital energy
Earth's own rotation at surface (for comparison; not an orbit)	6,378 km	0 km	465.1 m/s (1,674 km/h or 1,040 mph)	23 h 56 min 4.09 sec	−62.6 MJ/kg
Orbiting at Earth's surface (equator) theoretical	6,378 km	0 km	7.9 km/s (28,440 km/h or 17,672 mph)	1 h 24 min 18 sec	−31.2 MJ/kg
Low Earth orbit	6,600 – 8,400 km	200 – 2,000 km	Circular orbit: 7.7–6.9 km/s (27,720–24,840 km/h or 17,224–15,435 mph) respectively; Elliptic: 10.07–8.7 km/s respectively	1 h 29 min – 2 h 8 min	−29.8 MJ/kg
Molniya orbit	6,900 – 46,300 km	500 – 39,900 km	1.5–10.0 km/s (5,400–36,000 km/h or 3,335–22,370 mph) respectively	11 h 58 min	−4.7 MJ/kg
Geostationary	42,000 km	35,786 km	3.1 km/s (11,600 km/h or 6,935 mph)	23 h 56 min 4.09 sec	−4.6 MJ/kg
Orbit of the Moon	363,000 – 406,000 km	357,000 – 399,000 km	0.97–1.08 km/s (3,492–3,888 km/h or 2,170–2,416 mph) respectively	27.27 days	−0.5 MJ/kg

The lower axis gives orbital speeds of some orbits.

== See also ==
- Specific energy change of rockets
- Characteristic energy C3 (Double the specific orbital energy)
