= Standard gravitational parameter =

Concept in celestial mechanics

Body	μ [m^{3}⋅s^{−2}]	
Sun	1.32712440042(10)	× 10^{20}
Mercury	2.2031870799(860)	× 10^{13}
Venus	3.24858592(6)	× 10^{14}
Earth	3.986004418(8)	× 10^{14}
Moon	4.902800118	× 10^{12}
Mars	4.282837(2)	× 10^{13}
Ceres	6.26325	× 10^{10}
Jupiter	1.26686534(9)	× 10^{17}
Saturn	3.7931187(9)	× 10^{16}
Uranus	5.793939(9)	× 10^{15}
Neptune	6.836529(9)	× 10^{15}
Pluto	8.71(9)	× 10^{11}
Eris	1.108(9)	× 10^{12}

The standard gravitational parameter μ of a celestial body is the product of the gravitational constant G and the mass M of that body. For two bodies, the parameter may be expressed as G(m_{1} + m_{2}), or as GM when one body is much larger than the other:
$$\mu=G(M+m)\approx GM .$$

For several objects in the Solar System, the value of μ is known to greater accuracy than either G or M. The SI unit of the standard gravitational parameter is m^{3}⋅s^{−2}. However, the unit km^{3}⋅s^{−2} is frequently used in the scientific literature and in spacecraft navigation.

== Definition ==
=== Small body orbiting a central body ===
Log–log plot of period T vs. semi-major axis a (average of aphelion and perihelion) of some Solar System orbits (crosses denoting Kepler's values) showing that a^{3}/T^{2} is constant (green line)

The central body in an orbital system can be defined as the one whose mass (M) is much larger than the mass of the orbiting body (m), or M ≫ m. This approximation is standard for planets orbiting the Sun or most moons and greatly simplifies equations. Under Newton's law of universal gravitation, if the distance between the bodies is r, the force exerted on the smaller body is:
$$F = \frac{G M m}{r^2} = \frac{\mu m}{r^2}$$

Thus only the product of G and M is needed to predict the motion of the smaller body. Conversely, measurements of the smaller body's orbit only provide information on the product, μ, not G and M separately. The gravitational constant, G, is difficult to measure with high accuracy, while orbits, at least in the solar system, can be measured with great precision and used to determine μ with similar precision.

For a circular orbit around a central body, where the centripetal force provided by gravity is F = mv^{2}r^{−1}:
$$\mu = rv^2 = r^3\omega^2 = \frac{4\pi^2r^3}{T^2} ,$$
where r is the orbit radius, v is the orbital speed, ω is the angular speed, and T is the orbital period.

This can be generalized for elliptic orbits:
$$\mu = \frac{4\pi^2a^3}{T^2} ,$$
where a is the semi-major axis, which is Kepler's third law.

For parabolic trajectories rv^{2} is constant and equal to 2μ. For elliptic and hyperbolic orbits magnitude of μ = 2 times the magnitude of a times the magnitude of ε, where a is the semi-major axis and ε is the specific orbital energy.

=== General case ===
In the more general case where the bodies need not be a large one and a small one, e.g. a binary star system, we define:

- the vector r is the position of one body relative to the other
- r, v, and in the case of an elliptic orbit, the semi-major axis a, are defined accordingly (hence r is the distance)
- μ = Gm_{1} + Gm_{2} = μ_{1} + μ_{2}, where m_{1} and m_{2} are the masses of the two bodies.

Then:

- for circular orbits, rv^{2} = r^{3}ω^{2} = 4π^{2}r^{3}/T^{2} = μ
- for elliptic orbits, 4π^{2}a^{3}/T^{2} = μ (with a expressed in AU; T in years and M the total mass relative to that of the Sun, we get a^{3}/T^{2} = M)
- for parabolic trajectories, rv^{2} is constant and equal to 2μ
- for elliptic and hyperbolic orbits, μ is twice the semi-major axis times the negative of the specific orbital energy, where the latter is defined as the total energy of the system divided by the reduced mass.

=== In a pendulum ===
The standard gravitational parameter can be determined using a pendulum oscillating above the surface of a body as:

$$\mu \approx \frac{4 \pi^2 r^2 L}{T^2}$$
where r is the radius of the gravitating body, L is the length of the pendulum, and T is the period of the pendulum (for the reason of the approximation see Pendulum in mechanics).

== Solar system ==
=== Geocentric gravitational constant ===
GM_{🜨}, the gravitational parameter for the Earth as the central body, is called the geocentric gravitational constant. It equals (3.986004418±0.000000008)×10^{14} m^{3}⋅s^{−2}.

The value of this constant became important with the beginning of spaceflight in the 1950s, and great effort was expended to determine it as accurately as possible during the 1960s. Sagitov (1969) cites a range of values reported from 1960s high-precision measurements, with a relative uncertainty of the order of 10^{−6}.

During the 1970s to 1980s, the increasing number of artificial satellites in Earth orbit further facilitated high-precision measurements, and the relative uncertainty was decreased by another three orders of magnitude, to about 2×10^{−9} (1 in 500 million) as of 1992. Measurement involves observations of the distances from the satellite to Earth stations at different times, which can be obtained to high accuracy using radar or laser ranging.

=== Heliocentric gravitational constant ===
GM_{☉}, the gravitational parameter for the Sun as the central body, is called the heliocentric gravitational constant or geopotential of the Sun and equals (1.32712440042±0.0000000001)×10^{20} m^{3}⋅s^{−2}.

The relative uncertainty in GM_{☉}, cited at below 10^{−10} as of 2015, is smaller than the uncertainty in GM_{🜨} because GM_{☉} is derived from the ranging of interplanetary probes, and the absolute error of the distance measures to them is about the same as the earth satellite ranging measures, while the absolute distances involved are much bigger.

== See also ==
- Astronomical system of units
- Planetary mass
