= Specific angular momentum =

Vector quantity in celestial mechanics

In celestial mechanics, the specific relative angular momentum (often denoted $\vec{h}$ or $\mathbf{h}$) of a body is the angular momentum of that body divided by its mass. In the case of two orbiting bodies it is the vector product of their relative position and relative linear momentum, divided by the mass of the body in question.

Specific relative angular momentum plays a pivotal role in the analysis of the two-body problem, as it remains constant for a given orbit under ideal conditions. "Specific" in this context indicates angular momentum per unit mass. The SI unit for specific relative angular momentum is square meter per second.

== Definition ==
The specific relative angular momentum is defined as the cross product of the relative position vector $\mathbf{r}$ and the relative velocity vector $\mathbf{v}$.
$$\mathbf{h} = \mathbf{r}\times \mathbf{v} = \frac{\mathbf{L}}{m}$$

where $\mathbf{L}$ is the angular momentum vector, defined as $\mathbf{r} \times m \mathbf{v}$.

The $\mathbf{h}$ vector is always perpendicular to the instantaneous osculating orbital plane, which coincides with the instantaneous perturbed orbit. It is not necessarily perpendicular to the average orbital plane over time.

== Proof of constancy in the two body case ==
Distance vector $\mathbf{r}$, velocity vector $\mathbf{v}$, true anomaly $\theta$ and flight path angle $\phi$ of $m_2$ in orbit around $m_1$. The most important measures of the ellipse are also depicted (among which, note that the true anomaly $\theta$ is labeled as $\nu$).

Under certain conditions, it can be proven that the specific angular momentum is constant. The conditions for this proof include:

- The mass of one object is much greater than the mass of the other one. ($m_1 \gg m_2$)
- The coordinate system is inertial.
- Each object can be treated as a spherically symmetrical point mass.
- No other forces act on the system other than the gravitational force that connects the two bodies.

=== Proof ===
The proof starts with the two body equation of motion, derived from Newton's law of universal gravitation:

$$\ddot{\mathbf{r}} + \frac{G m_1}{r^2}\frac{\mathbf{r}}{r} = 0$$

where:

- $\mathbf{r}$ is the position vector from $m_1$ to $m_2$ with scalar magnitude $r$.
- $\ddot{\mathbf{r}}$ is the second time derivative of $\mathbf{r}$. (the acceleration)
- $G$ is the Gravitational constant.

The cross product of the position vector with the equation of motion is:

$$\mathbf{r} \times \ddot{\mathbf{r}} + \mathbf{r} \times \frac{G m_1}{r^2}\frac{\mathbf{r}}{r} = 0$$

Because $\mathbf{r} \times \mathbf{r} = 0$ the second term vanishes:

$$\mathbf{r} \times \ddot{\mathbf{r}} = 0$$

It can also be derived that:
$$\frac{\mathrm{d}}{\mathrm{d}t} \left(\mathbf{r}\times\dot{\mathbf{r}}\right) =
\dot{\mathbf{r}} \times \dot{\mathbf{r}} + \mathbf{r} \times \ddot{\mathbf{r}} =
\mathbf{r} \times \ddot{\mathbf{r}}$$

Combining these two equations gives:
$$\frac{\mathrm{d}}{\mathrm{d}t} \left(\mathbf{r}\times\dot{\mathbf{r}}\right) = 0$$

Since the time derivative is equal to zero, the quantity $\mathbf{r} \times \dot{\mathbf{r}}$ is constant. Using the velocity vector $\mathbf{v}$ in place of the rate of change of position, and $\mathbf{h}$ for the specific angular momentum:
$$\mathbf{h} = \mathbf{r}\times\mathbf{v}$$
is constant.

This is different from the normal construction of momentum, $\mathbf{r} \times \mathbf{p}$, because it does not include the mass of the object in question.

== Kepler's laws of planetary motion ==
Kepler's laws of planetary motion can be proved almost directly with the above relationships.

=== First law ===
The proof starts again with the equation of the two-body problem. This time the cross product is multiplied with the specific relative angular momentum
$$\ddot{\mathbf{r}} \times \mathbf{h} = - \frac{\mu}{r^2}\frac{\mathbf{r}}{r} \times \mathbf{h}$$

The left hand side is equal to the derivative $\frac{\mathrm{d}}{\mathrm{d}t} \left(\dot{\mathbf{r}}\times\mathbf{h}\right)$ because the angular momentum is constant.

After some steps (which includes using the vector triple product and defining the scalar $\dot{r}$ to be the radial velocity, as opposed to the norm of the vector $\dot{\mathbf{r}}$) the right hand side becomes:
$$-\frac{\mu}{r^3}\left(\mathbf{r} \times \mathbf{h}\right) =
-\frac{\mu}{r^3} \left(\left(\mathbf{r}\cdot\mathbf{v}\right)\mathbf{r} - r^2\mathbf{v}\right) =
-\left(\frac{\mu}{r^2}\dot{r}\mathbf{r} - \frac{\mu}{r}\mathbf{v}\right) =
\mu \frac{\mathrm{d}}{\mathrm{d}t}\left(\frac{\mathbf{r}}{r}\right)$$

Setting these two expression equal and integrating over time leads to (with the constant of integration $\mathbf{C}$)
$$\dot{\mathbf{r}}\times\mathbf{h} = \mu\frac{\mathbf{r}}{r} + \mathbf{C}$$

Now this equation is multiplied (dot product) with $\mathbf{r}$ and rearranged
$$\begin{align}
\mathbf{r} \cdot \left(\dot{\mathbf{r}}\times\mathbf{h}\right) &= \mathbf{r} \cdot \left(\mu\frac{\mathbf{r}}{r} + \mathbf{C}\right) \\
\Rightarrow \left(\mathbf{r}\times\dot{\mathbf{r}}\right) \cdot \mathbf{h} &= \mu r + r C\cos\theta \\
\Rightarrow                                                            h^2 &= \mu r + r C\cos\theta
\end{align}$$

Finally one gets the orbit equation
$$r = \frac{\frac{h^2}{\mu}}{1 + \frac{C}{\mu}\cos\theta}$$

which is the equation of a conic section in polar coordinates with semi-latus rectum $\ell = \frac{h^2}{\mu}$ and eccentricity $e = \frac{C}{\mu}$.

=== Second law ===
The second law follows instantly from the second of the three equations to calculate the absolute value of the specific relative angular momentum.

If one connects this form of the equation $\mathrm{d}t = \frac{r^2}{h} \, \mathrm{d}\theta$ with the relationship $\mathrm{d}A = \frac{r^2}{2} \, \mathrm{d}\theta$ for the area of a sector with an infinitesimal small angle $\mathrm{d}\theta$ (triangle with one very small side), the equation
$$\mathrm{d}t = \frac{2}{h} \, \mathrm{d}A$$

=== Third law ===
Kepler's third is a direct consequence of the second law. Integrating over one revolution gives the orbital period
$$T = \frac{2\pi ab}{h}$$

for the area $\pi ab$ of an ellipse. Replacing the semi-minor axis with $b=\sqrt{a\ell}$ and the specific relative angular momentum with $h = \sqrt{\mu \ell}$ one gets
$$T = 2\pi \sqrt{\frac{a^3}{\mu}}$$

There is thus a relationship between the semi-major axis and the orbital period of a satellite that can be reduced to a constant of the central body.

== See also ==
- Specific orbital energy, another conserved quantity in the two-body problem.
- Classical central-force problem § Specific angular momentum
