= Laplace limit =

Maximum eccentricity for which a power series for Kepler's equation converges

In mathematics, the Laplace limit is the maximum value of the eccentricity for which a solution to Kepler's equation, in terms of a power series in the eccentricity, converges. It is approximately

0.66274 34193 49181 58097 47420 97109 25290.

Kepler's equation M = E − ε sin E relates the mean anomaly M with the eccentric anomaly E for a body moving in an ellipse with eccentricity ε. This equation cannot be solved for E in terms of elementary functions, but the Lagrange reversion theorem gives the solution as a power series in ε:

$$E = M + \sin(M) \, \varepsilon + \tfrac12 \sin(2M) \, \varepsilon^2 + \left( \tfrac38 \sin(3M) - \tfrac18 \sin(M) \right) \, \varepsilon^3 + \cdots$$

or in general

$$E = M \;+\; \sum_{n=1}^{\infty} \frac{\varepsilon^n}{2^{n-1}\,n!} \sum_{k=0}^{\lfloor n/2\rfloor} (-1)^k\,\binom{n}{k}\,(n-2k)^{n-1}\,\sin((n-2k)\,M)$$

Laplace realized that this series converges for small values of the eccentricity, but diverges for any value of M other than a multiple of π if the eccentricity exceeds a certain value that does not depend on M. The Laplace limit is this value. It is the radius of convergence of the power series.

It is also the maximum of the function $\frac{x}{\text{cosh} (x)}.$

It is the unique real solution of the transcendental equation

$$\frac{x\exp(\sqrt{1+x^2})}{1+\sqrt{1+x^2}}=1.$$

In 2022, István Mező gave a closed-form expression in terms of the r-Lambert function

$$\lambda = \sqrt{\left(\frac{1}{2} W_{-1/e^2, \, 0+}(4e^{-2}) + 1\right)^2 - 1}.$$

In the same paper, Mező also provides an infinite series representation in terms of Laguerre polynomials

$$\sqrt{\lambda^2 + 1} = 1 - 2 \sum_{n=1}^{\infty} \frac{L'_n(4n)}{n} e^{-2n}.$$

== History ==
Laplace calculated the value 0.66195 in 1827. The Italian astronomer Francesco Carlini found the limit 0.66 five years before Laplace. Cauchy in 1829 gave the precise value 0.66274.

== See also ==
- Orbital eccentricity
