= True anomaly =

Parameter of Keplerian orbits

The true anomaly of point P is the angle f. The center of the ellipse is point C, and the focus is point F.

In celestial mechanics, true anomaly is an angular parameter that defines the position of a body moving along a Keplerian orbit. It is the angle between the direction of periapsis and the current position of the body, as seen from the main focus of the ellipse (the point around which the object orbits).

The true anomaly is usually denoted by the Greek letters ν or θ, or the Latin letter f, and is usually restricted to the range 0–360° (0–2π rad).

The true anomaly f is one of three angular parameters (anomalies) that can be used to define a position along an orbit, the other two being the eccentric anomaly and the mean anomaly.

== Etymology ==
The term "anomaly" originally referred to the irregular movements of planets. Over time, that phrase evolved to refer to the general angular location of a planet around its orbit. The word true was added to refer to the actual angular location as opposed to other estimations of calculations of angular locations, for example mean anomaly.

== Formulas ==
=== From state vectors ===
For elliptic orbits, the true anomaly ν can be calculated from orbital state vectors as:

$\nu = \arccos { {\mathbf{e} \cdot \mathbf{r}} \over { \mathbf{\left |e \right |} \mathbf{\left |r \right |} }}$

(if r ⋅ v < 0 then replace ν by 2π − ν)

where:

- v is the orbital velocity vector of the orbiting body,
- e is the eccentricity vector,
- r is the orbital position vector (segment FP in the figure) of the orbiting body.

==== Circular orbit ====
For circular orbits the true anomaly is undefined, because circular orbits do not have a uniquely determined periapsis. Instead the argument of latitude u is used:

$u = \arccos { {\mathbf{n} \cdot \mathbf{r}} \over { \mathbf{\left |n \right |} \mathbf{\left |r \right |} }}$

(if r_{z} < 0 then replace u by 2π − u)

where:

- n is a vector pointing towards the ascending node (i.e. the z-component of n is zero).
- r_{z} is the z-component of the orbital position vector r

==== Circular orbit with zero inclination ====
For circular orbits with zero inclination the argument of latitude is also undefined, because there is no uniquely determined line of nodes. One uses the true longitude instead:

$l = \arccos { r_x \over { \mathbf{\left |r \right |}}}$

(if v_{x} > 0 then replace l by 2π − l)

where:

- r_{x} is the x-component of the orbital position vector r
- v_{x} is the x-component of the orbital velocity vector v.

=== From the eccentric anomaly ===
The relation between the true anomaly ν and the eccentric anomaly $E$ is:

$$\cos{\nu} = {{\cos{E} - e} \over {1 - e \cos{E}}}$$

or using the sine and tangent:

$$\begin{align}
\sin{\nu} &= {{\sqrt{1 - e^2\,} \sin{E}} \over {1 - e \cos{E}}} \\[4pt]
\tan{\nu} = {{\sin{\nu}} \over {\cos{\nu}}} &= {{\sqrt{1 - e^2\,} \sin{E}} \over {\cos{E} -e}}
\end{align}$$

or equivalently:

$$\tan{\nu \over 2} = \sqrt{{{1 + e\,} \over {1-e\,}}} \tan{E \over 2}$$

so

$$\nu = 2 \, \operatorname{arctan}\left(\, \sqrt{{{1 + e\,} \over {1 - e\,}}} \tan{E \over 2} \, \right)$$

Alternatively, a form of this equation was derived by R. Broucke and P. Cefola that avoids numerical issues when the arguments are near $\pm\pi$, as the two tangents become infinite. Additionally, since $\frac{E}{2}$ and $\frac{\nu}{2}$ are always in the same quadrant, there will not be any sign problems.

$\tan{\frac{1}{2}(\nu - E)} = \frac{\beta\sin{E}}{1 - \beta\cos{E}}$ where $\beta = \frac{e}{1 + \sqrt{1 - e^2}}$

so

$$\nu = E + 2\operatorname{arctan}\left(\,\frac{\beta\sin{E}}{1 - \beta\cos{E}}\,\right)$$

=== From the mean anomaly ===
The true anomaly can be calculated directly from the mean anomaly $M$ via a Fourier expansion:

$$\nu = M + 2 \sum_{k=1}^{\infty}\frac{1}{k} \left[ \sum_{n=-\infty}^{\infty} J_n(-ke)\beta^{|k+n|} \right] \sin{kM}$$

with Bessel functions $J_n$ and parameter $\beta = \frac{1-\sqrt{1-e^2}}{e}$.

Omitting all terms of order $e^4$ or higher (indicated by $\operatorname{\mathcal{O}}\left(e^4\right)$), it can be written as

$$\nu = M + \left(2e - \frac{1}{4} e^3\right) \sin{M} + \frac{5}{4} e^2 \sin{2M} + \frac{13}{12} e^3 \sin{3M} + \operatorname{\mathcal{O}}\left(e^4\right).$$

Note that for reasons of accuracy this approximation is usually limited to orbits where the eccentricity $e$ is small.

The expression $\nu - M$ is known as the equation of the center, where more details about the expansion are given.

=== Radius from true anomaly ===
The radius (distance between the focus of attraction and the orbiting body) is related to the true anomaly by the formula

$$r(t) = a\,{1 - e^2 \over 1 + e \cos\nu(t)}\,\!$$

where a is the orbit's semi-major axis.

In celestial mechanics, Projective anomaly is an angular parameter that defines the position of a body moving along a Keplerian orbit. It is the angle between the direction of periapsis and the current position of the body in the projective space.

The projective anomaly is usually denoted by $\theta$ and is usually restricted to the range 0 - 360 degrees (0 - 2 $\pi$ radians).

The projective anomaly $\theta$ is one of four angular parameters (anomalies) that defines a position along an orbit, the other three being the eccentric anomaly, the true anomaly, and the mean anomaly.

In the projective geometry, circles, ellipses, parabolae, and hyperbolae are treated as the same kind of quadratic curves.

== Projective parameters and projective anomaly ==
An orbit type is classified by two project parameters $\alpha$ and $\beta$ as follows,

- circular orbit $\beta=0$
- elliptic orbit $\alpha \beta < 1$
- parabolic orbit $\alpha \beta = 1$
- hyperbolic orbit $\alpha \beta > 1$
- linear orbit $\alpha = \beta$
- imaginary orbit $\alpha < \beta$

where

$\alpha= \frac{ ( 1 + e ) ( q - p ) + \sqrt{ ( 1 + e )^2 ( q + p )^2 + 4 e^2} }{2}$

$\beta= \frac{ 2 e }{ (1 + e ) ( q + p ) + \sqrt{ ( 1 + e )^2 ( q + p )^2 + 4 e^2} }$

$q = (1 - e) a$

$p = \frac{1}{Q} = \frac{ 1 }{ (1 + e) a}$

where $\alpha$ is semi major axis, $e$ is eccentricity, $q$ is perihelion distance, and $Q$ is aphelion distance.

Position and heliocentric distance of the planet $x$, $y$ and $r$ can be calculated as functions of the projective anomaly $\theta$ :

$x = \frac{ - \beta + \alpha \cos \theta }{ 1 + \alpha \beta \cos \theta }$

$y = \frac{ \sqrt{ \alpha^2- \beta^2 } \sin \theta}{ 1 + \alpha \beta \cos \theta }$

$r = \frac{ \alpha - \beta \cos \theta }{ 1 + \alpha \beta \cos \theta }$

== Kepler's equation ==
The projective anomaly $\theta$ can be calculated from the eccentric anomaly $u$ as follows,

- Case : $\alpha \beta < 1$

$\tan \frac{ \theta }{ 2 } = \sqrt{ \frac{ 1 + \alpha \beta }{ 1 - \alpha \beta } } \tan \frac{ u }{ 2 }$

$u - e \sin u = M = \left(\frac{1 - \alpha^2 \beta^2}{\alpha ( 1 + \beta^2 )}\right)^{3/2} k ( t - T_0 )$

- case : $\alpha \beta = 1$

$\frac{ s^3 }{ 3 } + \frac{ \alpha^2 - 1 }{ \alpha^2 + 1} s = \frac{2 k ( t - T_0 )}{\sqrt{ \alpha ( \alpha^2 + 1)^3 } }$

$s = \tan \frac{ \theta }{ 2 }$

- case : $\alpha \beta > 1$

$\tan \frac{ \theta }{ 2 } = \sqrt{ \frac{ \alpha \beta + 1 }{ \alpha \beta - 1 } } \tanh \frac{ u }{ 2 }$

$e \sinh u - u = M = \left(\frac{ \alpha^2 \beta^2 - 1 }{\alpha ( 1 + \beta^2 )}\right)^{3/2} k ( t - T_0 )$

The above equations are called Kepler's equation.

== Generalized anomaly ==
For arbitrary constant $\lambda$, the generalized anomaly $\Theta$ is related as

$\tan \frac{ \Theta }{ 2 } = \lambda \tan \frac{ u }{ 2 }$

The eccentric anomaly, the true anomaly, and the projective anomaly are the cases of $\lambda=1$, $\lambda=\sqrt{\frac{1+e}{1-e}}$, $\lambda=\sqrt{\frac{1+\alpha\beta}{1-\alpha\beta}}$, respectively.

- Sato, I., "A New Anomaly of Keplerian Motion", Astronomical Journal Vol.116, pp. 2038-3039, (1997)

== See also ==
- Two body problem
- Mean anomaly
- Eccentric anomaly
- Kepler's equation
- Projective geometry
- Kepler's laws of planetary motion
- Ellipse
- Hyperbola
