= Lagrange's theorem =

In mathematics, Lagrange's theorem usually refers to any of the following theorems, attributed to Joseph Louis Lagrange:

- Lagrange's theorem (group theory)
- Lagrange's theorem (number theory)
- Lagrange's four-square theorem, which states that every positive integer can be expressed as the sum of four squares of integers
- Mean value theorem in calculus
- The Lagrange inversion theorem
- The Lagrange reversion theorem
- The method of Lagrangian multipliers for mathematical optimization
