= Argument of latitude =

Angular parameter in celestial mechanics

In celestial mechanics, the argument of latitude ($u$) is an angular parameter that defines the position of a body moving along a Kepler orbit. It is the angle between the ascending node and the body.

It is the sum of the more commonly used true anomaly and argument of periapsis.

$u = \nu + \omega$

where $u$ is the argument of latitude, $\nu$ the true anomaly, and $\omega$ the argument of periapsis.
