= Jacobi coordinates =

Set of coordinates used in few-body calculations

Jacobi coordinates for two-body problem; Jacobi coordinates are $\boldsymbol{R}=\frac {m_1}{M} \boldsymbol{x}_1 + \frac {m_2}{M} \boldsymbol{x}_2$ and $\boldsymbol{r} = \boldsymbol{x}_1 - \boldsymbol{x}_2$ with $M = m_1+m_2$.

A possible set of Jacobi coordinates for four-body problem; the Jacobi coordinates are r_{1}, r_{2}, r_{3} and the center of mass R. See Cornille.

In the theory of many-particle systems, Jacobi coordinates often are used to simplify the mathematical formulation. These coordinates are particularly common in treating polyatomic molecules and chemical reactions, and in celestial mechanics. An algorithm for generating the Jacobi coordinates for N bodies may be based upon binary trees. In words, the algorithm may be described as follows:

We choose two of the N bodies with position coordinates x_{j} and x_{k} and we replace them with one virtual body at their centre of mass. We define the relative position coordinate r_{jk} = x_{j} − x_{k}. We then repeat the process with the N − 1 bodies consisting of the other N − 2 plus the new virtual body. After N − 1 such steps we will have Jacobi coordinates consisting of the relative positions and one coordinate giving the position of the last defined centre of mass.

For the N-body problem the result is:

$$\boldsymbol{r}_j= \frac{1}{m_{0j}} \sum_{k=1}^j m_k\boldsymbol {x}_k \ - \ \boldsymbol{x}_{j+1}\ , \quad j \in \{1, 2, \dots, N-1\}$$
$$\boldsymbol{r}_N= \frac{1}{m_{0N}} \sum_{k=1}^N m_k\boldsymbol {x}_k \ ,$$

with

$$m_{0j} = \sum_{k=1}^j \ m_k \ .$$

The vector $\boldsymbol{r}_N$ is the center of mass of all the bodies and $\boldsymbol{r}_1$ is the relative coordinate between the particles 1 and 2:

The result one is left with is thus a system of N-1 translationally invariant coordinates $\boldsymbol{r}_1, \dots, \boldsymbol{r}_{N-1}$ and a center of mass coordinate $\boldsymbol{r}_N$, from iteratively reducing two-body systems within the many-body system.

This change of coordinates has associated Jacobian equal to $1$.

If one is interested in evaluating a free energy operator in these coordinates, one obtains

$$H_0=-\sum_{j=1}^N\frac{\hbar^2}{2 m_j}\, \nabla^2_{\boldsymbol{x}_j} = -\frac{\hbar^2}{2 m_{0N}}\,\nabla^2_{\boldsymbol{r}_{N}}\!-\frac{\hbar^2}{2}\sum_{j=1}^{N-1}\!\left(\frac{1}{m_{j+1}}+\frac{1}{m_{0j}}\right)\nabla^2_{\boldsymbol{r}_j}$$

In the calculations can be useful the following identity

$$\sum_{k=j+1}^N \frac{m_k}{m_{0k}m_{0k-1}}=\frac{1}{m_{0j}}-\frac{1}{m_{0N}}$$.
