= Lagrange reversion theorem =

Gives power series for certain implict functions

In mathematics, the Lagrange reversion theorem gives series or formal power series expansions of certain implicitly defined functions; indeed, of compositions with such functions.

Let $v$ be a function of $x$ and $y$ in terms of another function $f$ such that

$$v=x+yf(v)$$

Then for any function $g$, for small enough $y$:

$$g(v)=g(x)+\sum_{k=1}^\infty\frac{y^k}{k!}\left(\frac\partial{\partial x}\right)^{k-1}\left(f(x)^kg'(x)\right).$$

In particular, if $g$ is the identity function $g(x)=x$, this reduces to

$$v=x+\sum_{k=1}^\infty\frac{y^k}{k!}\left(\frac\partial{\partial x}\right)^{k-1}\left(f(x)^k\right),$$

in which case the equation can be derived using perturbation theory.

In 1770, Joseph Louis Lagrange (1736–1813) published his power series solution of the implicit equation for $v$ mentioned above. However, his solution used cumbersome series expansions of logarithms. In 1780, Pierre-Simon Laplace (1749–1827) published a simpler proof of the theorem, which was based on relations between partial derivatives with respect to the variable $x$ and the parameter $y$. Charles Hermite (1822–1901) presented the most straightforward proof of the theorem by using contour integration.

Lagrange's reversion theorem is used to obtain numerical solutions to Kepler's equation.

== Simple proof ==
We start by writing

$$g(v) = \int \delta(y f(z) - z + x) g(z) (1-y f'(z)) \, dz.$$

Writing the delta-function as an integral, we have:

$$\begin{align}
g(v) & = \iint \exp(\mathrm{i}k[y f(z) - z + x]) g(z) (1-y f'(z)) \, \frac{dk}{2\pi} \, dz \\[10pt]
& =\sum_{n=0}^\infty \iint \frac{(\mathrm{i}k y f(z))^n}{n!} g(z) (1-y f'(z)) \mathrm{e}^{\mathrm{i}k(x-z)}\, \frac{dk}{2\pi} \, dz \\[10pt]
& =\sum_{n=0}^\infty \left(\frac{\partial}{\partial x}\right)^n\iint \frac{(y f(z))^n}{n!} g(z) (1-y f'(z)) \mathrm{e}^{\mathrm{i}k(x-z)} \, \frac{dk}{2\pi} \, dz
\end{align}$$

The integral over $k$ then gives $\delta(x-z)$ and we have:

$$\begin{align}
g(v) & = \sum_{n=0}^\infty \left(\frac{\partial}{\partial x}\right)^n \left[ \frac{(y f(x))^n}{n!} g(x) (1-y f'(x))\right] \\[10pt]
& =\sum_{n=0}^\infty \left(\frac{\partial}{\partial x}\right)^n \left[
\frac{y^n f(x)^n g(x)}{n!} - \frac{y^{n+1}}{(n+1)!}\left\{ (g(x) f(x)^{n+1})' - g'(x) f(x)^{n+1}\right\} \right]
\end{align}$$

Rearranging the sum and cancelling then gives the result:

$$g(v)=g(x)+\sum_{k=1}^\infty\frac{y^k}{k!}\left(\frac\partial{\partial x}\right)^{k-1}\left(f(x)^kg'(x)\right)$$
