= Eccentric anomaly =

Angle defining a position in an orbit

In orbital mechanics, the eccentric anomaly is an angular parameter that defines the position of a body that is moving along an elliptic Kepler orbit, the angle measured at the center of the ellipse between the orbit's periapsis and the current position. The eccentric anomaly is one of three angular parameters ("anomalies") that can be used to define a position along an orbit, the other two being the true anomaly and the mean anomaly.

== Graphical representation ==
The eccentric anomaly of point P is the angle E. The center of the ellipse is point O, and the focus is point F.

Consider the ellipse with equation given by:

$$\frac{x^2}{a^2} + \frac{y^2}{b^2} = 1,$$

where a is the semi-major axis and b is the semi-minor axis.

For a point on the ellipse, $P = P(x, y)$, representing the position of an orbiting body in an elliptical orbit, the eccentric anomaly is the angle E in the figure. The eccentric anomaly E is one of the angles of a right triangle with one vertex at the center of the ellipse, its adjacent side lying on the major axis, having hypotenuse a (equal to the semi-major axis of the ellipse), and opposite side (perpendicular to the major axis and touching the point P' on the auxiliary circle of radius a) that passes through the point P. The eccentric anomaly is measured in the same direction as the true anomaly, shown in the figure as $\theta$. The eccentric anomaly E in terms of these coordinates is given by:

$$\cos E = \frac{x}{a} ,$$

and

$$\sin E = \frac{y}{b}$$

The second equation is established using the relationship

$$\left(\frac{y}{b}\right)^2 = 1 - \cos^2 E = \sin^2 E$$,

which implies that $\sin E = \pm \frac{y}{b}$. The equation $\sin E = -\frac{y}{b}$ is immediately able to be ruled out since it traverses the ellipse in the wrong direction. The second equation can be viewed as coming from a similar triangle with its opposite side having the same length y as the distance from P to the major axis, and its hypotenuse b equal to the semi-minor axis of the ellipse.

== Formulas ==
=== Radius and eccentric anomaly ===
The eccentricity e is defined as:

$$e=\sqrt{1 - \left(\frac{b}{a}\right)^2 } \ .$$

From Pythagoras's theorem applied to the triangle with r (a distance $FP$) as hypotenuse:

$$\begin{align}
r^2 &= b^2 \sin^2E + (ae - a\cos E)^2 \\
&= a^2\left(1 - e^2\right)\left(1 - \cos^2 E\right) + a^2 \left(e^2 - 2e\cos E + \cos^2 E\right) \\
&= a^2 - 2a^2 e\cos E + a^2 e^2 \cos^2 E \\
&= a^2 \left(1 - e\cos E\right)^2 \\
\end{align}$$

Thus, the radius (distance from the focus to point P) is related to the eccentric anomaly by the formula

$$r = a \left(1 - e \cos{E}\right) \ .$$

With this result the eccentric anomaly can be determined from the true anomaly as shown next.

=== From the true anomaly ===
The true anomaly is the angle labeled $\theta$ in the figure, located at the focus of the ellipse. It is sometimes represented by f or ν. The true anomaly and the eccentric anomaly are related as follows.

Using the formula for r above, the sine and cosine of E are found in terms of f :

$$\begin{align}
\cos E &= \frac{\,x\,}{a} = \frac{\, a e + r \cos f \,}{a} = e + (1 - e \cos E) \cos f \\
\Rightarrow \cos E &= \frac{\, e + \cos f \,}{1 + e \cos f} \\
\sin E &= \sqrt{\, 1 - \cos^2 E \;} = \frac{\, \sqrt{\, 1 - e^2 \;} \, \sin f \,}{ 1 + e\cos f } ~.
\end{align}$$

Hence,

$$\tan E = \frac{\, \sin E \,}{\cos E} = \frac{\, \sqrt{\, 1 - e^2 \;} \, \sin f \,}{e + \cos f} ~.$$

where the correct quadrant for E is given by the signs of numerator and denominator, so that E can be most easily found using an atan2 function.

Angle E is therefore the adjacent angle of a right triangle with hypotenuse $\; 1 + e \cos f \;,$ adjacent side $\; e + \cos f \;,$ and opposite side $\;\sqrt{ \, 1 - e^2 \; } \, \sin f \;.$

Also,

$$\tan\frac{\, f \,}{2} = \sqrt{\frac{\, 1 + e \,}{1 - e}\,}  \,\tan\frac{\, E \,}{2}$$

Substituting $\cos E$ as found above into the expression for r, the radial distance from the focal point to the point P, can be found in terms of the true anomaly as well:

$$r = \frac{a \left(\, 1 - e^2 \,\right)}{\,  1 + e \cos f \, } =  \frac{p}{\,  1 + e \cos f \, }\,$$

where

$$\, p \equiv a \left(\, 1 - e^2 \,\right)$$

is called the semi-latus rectum in classical geometry.

=== From the mean anomaly ===
The eccentric anomaly E is related to the mean anomaly M by Kepler's equation:

$$M = E - e \sin E$$

This equation does not have a closed-form solution for E given M. It is usually solved by numerical methods, e.g. the Newton–Raphson method. It may be expressed in a Fourier series as

$$E = M + 2\sum_{n=1}^{\infty } \frac{J_{n}(ne)}{n}\sin(n M)$$

where $J_{n}(x)$ is the Bessel function of the first kind.

The above equation diverges for values of $e > 0.6627434$.

== See also ==
- Eccentricity vector
- Orbital eccentricity
- Universal variable formulation

== Sources ==
- Murray, Carl D.; & Dermott, Stanley F. (1999); Solar System Dynamics, Cambridge University Press, Cambridge, GB
- Plummer, Henry C. K. (1960); An Introductory Treatise on Dynamical Astronomy, Dover Publications, New York, NY (Reprint of the 1918 Cambridge University Press edition)
