= Kepler problem =

Special case of the two-body problem

In classical mechanics, the Kepler problem is a special case of the two-body problem, in which the two bodies interact by a central force that varies in strength as the inverse square of the distance between them. The force may be either attractive or repulsive. The problem is to find the position or speed of the two bodies over time given their masses, positions, and velocities. Using classical mechanics, the solution can be expressed as a Kepler orbit using six orbital elements.

The Kepler problem is named after Johannes Kepler, who proposed Kepler's laws of planetary motion (which are part of classical mechanics and solved the problem for the orbits of the planets) and investigated the types of forces that would result in orbits obeying those laws (called Kepler's inverse problem).

For a discussion of the Kepler problem specific to radial orbits, see Radial trajectory. General relativity provides more accurate solutions to the two-body problem, especially in strong gravitational fields.

== Applications ==
The inverse square law behind the Kepler problem is the most important central force law. The Kepler problem is important in celestial mechanics, since Newtonian gravity obeys an inverse square law. Examples include a satellite moving about a planet, a planet about its sun, or two binary stars about each other. The Kepler problem is also important in the motion of two charged particles, since Coulomb’s law of electrostatics also obeys an inverse square law.

The Kepler problem and the simple harmonic oscillator problem are the two most fundamental problems in classical mechanics. They are the only two problems that have closed orbits for every possible set of initial conditions, i.e., return to their starting point with the same velocity (Bertrand's theorem).

The Kepler problem also conserves the Laplace–Runge–Lenz vector, which has since been generalized to include other interactions. The solution of the Kepler problem allowed scientists to show that planetary motion could be explained entirely by classical mechanics and Newton’s law of gravity; the scientific explanation of planetary motion played an important role in ushering in the Enlightenment.

== History ==
The Kepler problem begins with the empirical results of Johannes Kepler arduously derived by analysis of the astronomical observations of Tycho Brahe. After some 70 attempts to match the data to circular orbits, Kepler hit upon the idea of the elliptic orbit. He eventually summarized his results in the form of three laws of planetary motion.

What is now called the Kepler problem was first discussed by Isaac Newton as a major part of his Principia. His "Theorema I" begins with the first two of his three axioms or laws of motion and results in Kepler's second law of planetary motion. Next, Newton proves his "Theorema II" which shows that if Kepler's second law results, then the force involved must be along the line between the two bodies. In other words, Newton proves what today might be called the "inverse Kepler problem": the orbit characteristics require the force to depend on the inverse square of the distance. Propositions XI–XIII provide Newton's solution to the direct Kepler problem, determining the centripetal-force law for a body moving in a conic. In Corollary I, he established the converse: a body acted upon by an inverse-square centripetal force must move along a conic having the center of force as a focus.

== Mathematical definition ==
The central force F between two objects varies in strength as the inverse square of the distance r between them:

$$\mathbf{F} = \frac{k}{r^{2}} \mathbf{\hat{r}}$$

where k is a constant and $\mathbf{\hat{r}}$ represents the unit vector along the line between them. The force may be either attractive (k < 0) or repulsive (k > 0). The corresponding scalar potential is:

$$V(r) = \frac{k}{r}$$

== Solution of the Kepler problem ==
The equation of motion for the radius $r$ of a particle of mass $m$ moving in a central potential $V(r)$ is given by Lagrange's equations

$$m\frac{d^2 r}{dt^2} - mr \omega^2 =
m\frac{d^2 r}{dt^2} - \frac{L^2}{mr^3} = -\frac{dV}{dr}$$

$\omega \equiv \frac{d\theta}{dt}$ and the angular momentum $L = mr^{2}\omega$ is conserved. For illustration, the first term on the left-hand side is zero for circular orbits, and the applied inwards force $\frac{dV}{dr}$ equals the centripetal force requirement $mr \omega^{2}$, as expected.

If L is not zero the definition of angular momentum allows a change of independent variable from $t$ to $\theta$

$$\frac{d}{dt} = \frac{L}{mr^{2}} \frac{d}{d\theta}$$

giving the new equation of motion that is independent of time

$$\frac{L}{r^2} \frac{d}{d\theta} \left( \frac{L}{mr^2} \frac{dr}{d\theta} \right)- \frac{L^2}{mr^3} = -\frac{dV}{dr}$$

The expansion of the first term is

$$\frac{L}{r^2} \frac{d}{d\theta} \left( \frac{L}{mr^2} \frac{dr}{d\theta} \right) = -\frac{2L^2}{mr^5} \left( \frac{dr}{d\theta} \right)^2 + \frac{L^2}{mr^4} \frac{d^2 r}{d\theta^2}$$

This equation becomes quasilinear on making the change of variables $u \equiv \frac{1}{r}$ and multiplying both sides by $\frac{mr^2}{L^2}$

$$\frac{du}{d\theta} = \frac{-1}{r^2} \frac{dr}{d\theta}$$

$$\frac{d^2 u}{d\theta^2} = \frac{2}{r^3} \left( \frac{dr}{d\theta} \right)^2 - \frac{1}{r^2} \frac{d^2 r}{d\theta^2}$$

After substitution and rearrangement:

$$\frac{d^2 u}{d\theta^2} + u = -\frac{m}{L^2}  \frac{d}{du} V\left(\frac 1 u\right)$$

For an inverse-square force law such as the gravitational or electrostatic potential, the scalar potential can be written

$$V(\mathbf{r}) = \frac{k}{r} = ku$$

The orbit $u(\theta)$ can be derived from the general equation

$$\frac{d^2 u}{d\theta^2} + u = -\frac{m}{L^2}  \frac{d}{du} V\left( \frac 1 u\right) = -\frac{km}{L^2}$$

whose solution is the constant $-\frac{km}{L^2}$ plus a simple sinusoid

$$u \equiv \frac{1}{r} = -\frac{km}{L^2} \left[ 1 + e \cos(\theta - \theta_0) \right]$$

where $e$ (the eccentricity) and $\theta_{0}$ (the phase offset) are constants of integration.

This is the general formula for a conic section that has one focus at the origin; $e=0$ corresponds to a circle, $e<1$ corresponds to an ellipse, $e=1$ corresponds to a parabola, and $e>1$ corresponds to a hyperbola. The eccentricity $e$ is related to the total energy $E$ (cf. the Laplace–Runge–Lenz vector)

$$e = \sqrt{1 + \frac{2EL^2}{k^2 m}}$$

Comparing these formulae shows that $E<0$ corresponds to an ellipse (all solutions which are closed orbits are ellipses), $E=0$ corresponds to a parabola, and $E>0$ corresponds to a hyperbola. In particular, $E=-\frac{k^2 m}{2L^2}$ for perfectly circular orbits (the central force exactly equals the centripetal force requirement, which determines the required angular velocity for a given circular radius).

For a repulsive force (k > 0) only e > 1 applies.

== See also ==
- Action-angle coordinates
- Bertrand's theorem
- Binet equation
- Hamilton–Jacobi equation
- Laplace–Runge–Lenz vector
- Kepler orbit
- Kepler problem in general relativity
- Kepler's equation
- Kepler's laws of planetary motion
