= Kepler's equation =

Orbital mechanics term

In orbital mechanics, Kepler's equation relates various geometric properties of the orbit of a body subject to a central force.

It was derived by Johannes Kepler in 1609 in Chapter 60 of his Astronomia nova, and in book V of his Epitome of Copernican Astronomy (1621) Kepler proposed an iterative solution to the equation. This equation and its solution, however, first appeared in a 9th-century work by Habash al-Hasib al-Marwazi, which dealt with problems of parallax. The equation has played an important role in the history of both physics and mathematics, particularly classical celestial mechanics.

== Equation ==
Kepler's equation solutions for five different eccentricities between 0 and 1

Kepler's equation is

Mean anomaly M and eccentric anomaly E

$M = E - e \sin E$

where $M$ is the mean anomaly, $E$ is the eccentric anomaly, and $e$ is the eccentricity.

The 'eccentric anomaly' $E$ is useful to compute the position of a point moving in a Keplerian orbit. As for instance, if the body passes the periastron at coordinates $x = a(1 - e)$, $y = 0$, at time $t = t_0$, then to find out the position of the body at any time, you first calculate the mean anomaly $M$ from the time and the mean motion $n$ by the formula $M = n(t - t_0)$, then solve the Kepler equation above to get $E$, then get the coordinates relative to the central gravitational body from:

$\begin{array}{lcl} x & = & a (\cos E - e) \\ y & = & b \sin E \end{array}$

where $a$ is the semi-major axis, $b$ the semi-minor axis.

Kepler's equation is a transcendental equation because sine is a transcendental function, and it cannot be solved for $E$ algebraically. Numerical analysis and series expansions are generally required to evaluate $E$.

== Alternate forms ==
There are several forms of Kepler's equation. Each form is associated with a specific type of orbit. The standard Kepler equation is used for elliptic orbits ($0 \le e < 1$). The hyperbolic Kepler equation is used for hyperbolic trajectories ($e > 1$). The radial Kepler equation is used for linear (radial) trajectories ($e = 1$). Barker's equation is used for parabolic trajectories (for which $e = 1$). With the parabolic orbit, unlike the elliptical or hyperbolic orbits, it is possible to solve Barker's equation and find a closed-form expression for the position as a function of time.

When $e = 0$, the orbit is circular. Increasing $e$ causes the circle to become elliptical. When $e = 1$, there are four possibilities:

- a parabolic trajectory,
- a trajectory that goes back and forth along a line segment from the centre of attraction to a point at some distance away,
- a trajectory going in or out along an infinite ray emanating from the centre of attraction, with its speed going to zero with distance
- or a trajectory along a ray, but with speed not going to zero with distance.

A value of $e$ slightly above 1 results in a hyperbolic orbit with a turning angle of just under 180 degrees. Further increases reduce the turning angle, and as $e$ goes to infinity, the orbit becomes a straight line of infinite length.

=== Hyperbolic Kepler equation ===
The Hyperbolic Kepler equation is:

$M = e \sinh (H) - H$

where $H$ is the hyperbolic eccentric anomaly. This equation is derived by redefining M to be the square root of −1 times the right-hand side of the elliptical equation:

$$M = i \left( E - e \sin E \right)$$

(in which $E$ is now imaginary) and then replacing $E$ by $iH$.

=== Radial Kepler equations ===
The Radial Kepler equation for the case where the object does not have enough energy to escape is:

$t(x) =\pm\biggr[ \sin^{-1}( \sqrt{ x } ) - \sqrt{ x ( 1 - x ) } \biggr]$

where $t$ is proportional to time and $x$ is proportional to the distance from the centre of attraction along the ray and attains the value 1 at the maximum distance. This equation is derived by multiplying Kepler's equation by 1/2 and setting $e$ to 1:

$$t(x) = \frac{1}{2}\left[ E - \sin E \right].$$

and then making the substitution

$$E = 2 \sin^{-1}(\sqrt{ x }).$$

The radial equation for when the object has enough energy to escape is:

$t(x) = \pm \biggr[\sinh^{-1}( \sqrt{ x } ) - \sqrt{ x ( 1 + x ) } \biggr]$

When the energy is exactly the minimum amount needed to escape, then the time is simply proportional to the distance to the power 3/2.

== Inverse problem ==
Calculating $M$ for a given value of $E$ is straightforward. However, solving for $E$ when $M$ is given can be considerably more challenging. There is no closed-form solution. Solving for $E$ is more or less equivalent to solving for the true anomaly, or the difference between the true anomaly and the mean anomaly, which is called the "Equation of the center".

One can write an infinite series expression for the solution to Kepler's equation using Lagrange inversion, but the series does not converge for all combinations of $e$ and $M$ (see below).

Confusion over the solvability of Kepler's equation has persisted in the literature for four centuries. Kepler himself expressed doubt at the possibility of finding a general solution:

I am sufficiently satisfied that it [Kepler's equation] cannot be solved a priori, on account of the different nature of the arc and the sine. But if I am mistaken, and any one shall point out the way to me, he will be in my eyes the great Apollonius.

— Johannes Kepler

Fourier series expansion (with respect to $M$) using Bessel functions is

$$E = M + \sum_{m=1}^\infty \frac{2}{m} J_m(me) \sin(mM), \quad e\le 1, \quad M \in [-\pi,\pi].$$

With respect to $e$, it is a Kapteyn series.

=== Inverse Kepler equation ===
The inverse Kepler equation is the solution of Kepler's equation for all real values of $e$:

$$E =
\begin{cases}
\displaystyle \sum_{n=1}^\infty
{\frac{M^{\frac{n}{3}}}{n!}} \lim_{\theta \to 0^+} \! \Bigg(
\frac{\mathrm{d}^{\,n-1}}{\mathrm{d}\theta^{\,n-1}} \bigg( \bigg(
\frac{\theta}{ \sqrt[3]{\theta - \sin(\theta)} } \bigg)^{\!\!\!n} \bigg)
\Bigg)
,  & e = 1  \\
\displaystyle \sum_{n=1}^\infty
{ \frac{ M^n }{ n! } }
\lim_{\theta \to 0^+} \! \Bigg(
\frac{\mathrm{d}^{\,n-1}}{\mathrm{d}\theta^{\,n-1}}  \bigg( \Big(
\frac{ \theta }{ \theta - e \sin(\theta)} \Big)^{\!n} \bigg)
\Bigg)
, & e \ne  1
\end{cases}$$

Evaluating this yields:

$$E =
\begin{cases} \displaystyle
s + \frac{1}{60} s^3 + \frac{1}{1400}s^5 + \frac{1}{25200}s^7 + \frac{43}{17248000}s^9 + \frac{ 1213}{7207200000 }s^{11} +
\frac{151439}{12713500800000 }s^{13}+ \cdots \text{ with }s = ( 6 M )^{1/3}
,  & e = 1\\
\\
\displaystyle
\frac{1}{1-e} M
- \frac{e}{(1-e)^4 } \frac{M^3}{3!}
+ \frac{(9 e^2 + e)}{(1-e)^7 } \frac{M^5}{5!}
- \frac{(225 e^3 + 54 e^2 + e) }{(1-e)^{10} } \frac{M^7}{7!}
+ \frac{ (11025 e^4 + 4131 e^3 + 243 e^2 + e) }{(1-e)^{13} } \frac{M^9}{9!}+ \cdots
, & e \ne  1
\end{cases}$$

These series can be reproduced in Mathematica with the InverseSeries operation.

InverseSeries[Series[M - Sin[M], {M, 0, 10}]]
InverseSeries[Series[M - e Sin[M], {M, 0, 10}]]

These functions are simple Maclaurin series. Such Taylor series representations of transcendental functions are considered to be definitions of those functions. Therefore, this solution is a formal definition of the inverse Kepler equation. However, $E$ is not an entire function of $M$ at a given non-zero $e$. Indeed, the derivative

$$\mathrm{dM}/\mathrm{d}E=1-e\cos E$$

goes to zero at an infinite set of complex numbers when $e < 1,$ the nearest to zero being at $E=\pm i\cosh^{-1}(1/e),$ and at these two points

$$M=E-e\sin E=\pm i\left(\cosh^{-1}(1/e)-\sqrt{1-e^2}\right)$$

(where inverse cosh is taken to be positive), and $\mathrm{d}E/\mathrm{d}M$ goes to infinity at these values of $M$. This means that the radius of convergence of the Maclaurin series is $\cosh^{-1}(1/e)-\sqrt{1-e^2}$ and the series will not converge for values of $M$ larger than this. The series can also be used for the hyperbolic case, in which case the radius of convergence is $\cos^{-1}(1/e)-\sqrt{e^2-1}.$ The series for when $e = 1$ converges when $M < 2\pi$.

While this solution is the simplest in a certain mathematical sense,, other solutions are preferable for most applications. Alternatively, Kepler's equation can be solved numerically.

The solution for $e \ne 1$ was found by Karl Stumpff in 1968, but its significance wasn't recognized.

One can also write a Maclaurin series in $e$. This series does not converge when $e$ is larger than the Laplace limit (about 0.66), regardless of the value of $M$ (unless $M$ is a multiple of 2π), but it converges for all $M$ if $e$ is less than the Laplace limit. The coefficients in the series, other than the first (which is simply $M$), depend on $M$ in a periodic way with period 2π.

=== Inverse radial Kepler equation ===
The inverse radial Kepler equation ($e = 1$) for the case in which the object does not have enough energy to escape can similarly be written as:

$$x( t ) = \sum_{n=1}^{ \infty }
\left[
\lim_{ r \to 0^+ } \left(
{\frac{ t^{ \frac{ 2 }{ 3 } n }}{ n! }}
\frac{\mathrm{d}^{\,n-1}}{\mathrm{ d } r ^{\,n-1}} \! \left(
r^n \left( \frac{ 3 }{ 2 } \Big( \sin^{-1}( \sqrt{ r } ) - \sqrt{ r - r^2 }  \Big)
\right)^{ \! -\frac{2}{3} n }
\right) \right)
\right]$$

Evaluating this yields:

$$x(t) =  p - \frac{1}{5} p^2 - \frac{3}{175}p^3
- \frac{23}{7875}p^4 - \frac{1894}{3031875}p^5 - \frac{3293}{21896875}p^6 - \frac{2418092}{62077640625}p^7 - \ \cdots \
\bigg| { p = \left( \tfrac{3}{2} t  \right)^{2/3} }$$

To obtain this result using Mathematica:

InverseSeries[Series[ArcSin[Sqrt[t]] - Sqrt[(1 - t) t], {t, 0, 15}]]

== Numerical approximation of inverse problem ==
=== Newton's method ===
For most applications, the inverse problem can be computed numerically by finding the root of the function:

$$f(E) = E - e \sin(E) - M(t)$$

This can be done iteratively via Newton's method:

$$E_{n+1} = E_{n} - \frac{f(E_{n})}{f'(E_{n})} =
E_{n} - \frac{ E_{n} - e \sin(E_{n}) - M(t) }{ 1 - e \cos(E_{n})}$$

Note that $E$ and $M$ are in units of radians in this computation. This iteration is repeated until desired accuracy is obtained (e.g. when $f(E)$ < desired accuracy). For most elliptical orbits an initial value of $E_0 = M(t)$ is sufficient. For orbits with $e > 0.8$, an initial value of $E_0 = \pi$ can be used. Numerous works developed accurate (but also more complex) start guesses. If $e$ is identically 1, then the derivative of $f$, which is in the denominator of Newton's method, can get close to zero, making derivative-based methods such as Newton-Raphson, secant, or regula falsi numerically unstable. In that case, the bisection method will provide guaranteed convergence, particularly since the solution can be bounded in a small initial interval. On modern computers, it is possible to achieve 4 or 5 digits of accuracy in 17 to 18 iterations. A similar approach can be used for the hyperbolic form of Kepler's equation. In the case of a parabolic trajectory, Barker's equation is used.

=== Fixed-point iteration ===
A related method starts by noting that $E = M + e \sin{E}$. Repeatedly substituting the expression on the right for the $E$ on the right yields a simple fixed-point iteration algorithm for evaluating $E(e,M)$. This method is identical to Kepler's 1621 solution. In pseudocode:

function E(e, M, n)
    E = M
    for k = 1 to n
        E = M + e*sin E
    next k
    return E

The number of iterations, $n$, depends on the value of $e$. The hyperbolic form similarly has $H = \sinh^{-1}\left(\frac{H+M}{e}\right)$.

This method is related to the Newton's method solution above in that

$$E_{n+1} = E_{n} - \frac{E_{n} - e \sin(E_{n}) - M(t)}{ 1 - e \cos(E_{n})} = E_{n} + \frac {(M + e \sin{E_{n}} - E_{n})(1 + e \cos{E_{n}})}{1 - e^2 (\cos{E_{n}})^2}$$

To first order in the small quantities $M-E_{n}$ and $e$,

$$E_{n+1} \approx M + e \sin{E_{n}}$$.

== See also ==
- Equation of the center
- Kepler's laws of planetary motion
- Kepler problem
- Kepler problem in general relativity
- Radial trajectory
