= Eccentricity (mathematics) =

Characteristic of conic sections

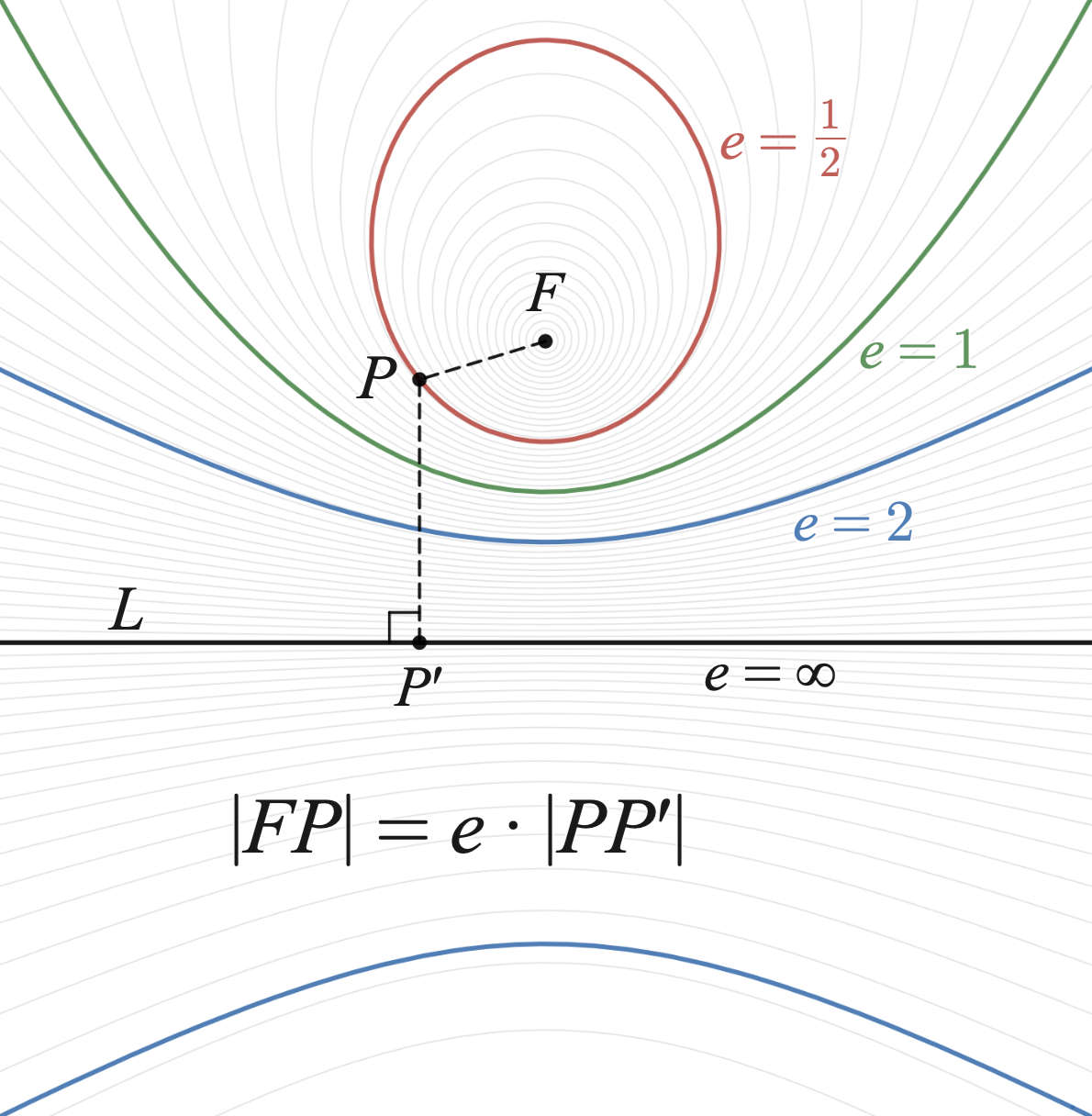
A family of conic sections of varying eccentricity share a focus point F and directrix line L, including an ellipse (red, e = 1/2), a parabola (green, e = 1), and a hyperbola (blue, e = 2). The conic of eccentricity 0 in this figure is an infinitesimal circle centered at the focus, and the conic of eccentricity ∞ is an infinitesimally separated pair of lines. A circle of finite radius has an infinitely distant directrix, while a pair of lines of finite separation have an infinitely distant focus.

In mathematics, the eccentricity of a conic section is a non-negative real number that uniquely characterizes its shape. One can think of the eccentricity as a measure of how much a conic section deviates from being circular. In particular:

- The eccentricity of a circle is 0.
- The eccentricity of a non-circular ellipse is between 0 and 1.
- The eccentricity of a parabola is 1.
- The eccentricity of a hyperbola is greater than 1.
- The eccentricity of a pair of lines is $\infty.$ (Note: The limiting eccentricity of a degenerate conic that is a double line is 1, as the limit of an ellipse with the ratio of the semi-minor to semi-major axis approaching zero ($b/a \to 0$), the eccentricity $e=\sqrt{1-(b/a)^2} \to 1$. This is also the case for the limit of a hyperbola with $b/a \to 0$, where the eccentricity $e=\sqrt{1+(b/a)^2} \to 1$. However, the limiting eccentricity of a degenerate conic that is a pair of intersecting lines is $\sec \alpha$, where $2\alpha$ is the angle between the lines. $e$ is infinity when $2\alpha=\pi$. This can be seen by considering the hyperbola $\frac{x^2}{a^2} - \frac{y^2}{b^2} = 1$ whose asymptotes are the intersecting lines $y = \pm \frac{b}{a} x$. The angle $2\alpha$ between the asymptotes is given by $\tan \alpha = b/a$. The eccentricity of the hyperbola is $e = \sqrt{1+(b/a)^2} = \sqrt{1+\tan^2 \alpha} = \sec \alpha$. As the hyperbola degenerates to its asymptotes, the eccentricity remains $\sec \alpha$.)

Two conic sections with the same eccentricity are similar.

== Definitions ==
Plane section of a cone

Any conic section can be defined as the locus of points whose distances to a point (the focus) and a line (the directrix) are in a constant ratio. That ratio is called the eccentricity, commonly denoted as e.

The eccentricity can also be defined in terms of the intersection of a plane and a double-napped cone associated with the conic section. If the cone is oriented with its axis vertical, the eccentricity is
$$e = \frac{\sin \beta}{\sin \alpha}, \ \ 0<\alpha<90^\circ, \ 0\le\beta\le90^\circ \ ,$$
where β is the angle between the plane and the horizontal and α is the angle between the cone's slant generator and the horizontal. For $\beta=0$ the plane section is a circle, for $\beta=\alpha$ a parabola. (The plane must not meet the vertex of the cone.)

The linear eccentricity of an ellipse or hyperbola, denoted c (or sometimes f or e), is the distance between its center and either of its two foci. The eccentricity can be defined as the ratio of the linear eccentricity to the semimajor axis a: that is, $e = \frac{c}{a}$ (lacking a center, the linear eccentricity for parabolas is not defined). A parabola can be treated as a limiting case of an ellipse or a hyperbola with one focal point at infinity.

== Alternative names ==
The eccentricity is sometimes called the first eccentricity to distinguish it from the second eccentricity and third eccentricity defined for ellipses (see below). The eccentricity is also sometimes called the numerical eccentricity.

In the case of ellipses and hyperbolas the linear eccentricity is sometimes called the half-focal separation.

== Notation ==
Three notational conventions are in common use:

1. e for the eccentricity and c for the linear eccentricity.
2. ε for the eccentricity and e for the linear eccentricity.
3. e or ϵ< for the eccentricity and f for the linear eccentricity (mnemonic for half-focal separation).

This article uses the first notation.

== Values ==
=== Standard form ===
Conic section	Equation	Eccentricity (e)	Linear eccentricity (c)
Circle	$x^2+y^2=r^2$	$0$	$0$
Ellipse	$\frac{x^2}{a^2}+\frac{y^2}{b^2}=1$ or $\frac{y^2}{a^2}+\frac{x^2}{b^2}=1$ where $a>b$	$\sqrt{1-\frac{b^2}{a^2}}$(e<1)	$\sqrt{a^2-b^2}$
Parabola	$x^2=4ay$	$1$	undefined ($\infty$)
Hyperbola	$\frac{x^2}{a^2}-\frac{y^2}{b^2}=1$ or $\frac{y^2}{a^2}-\frac{x^2}{b^2}=1$	(e>1)$\sqrt{1+\frac{b^2}{a^2}}$	$\sqrt{a^2+b^2}$

Here, for the ellipse and the hyperbola, a is the length of the semi-major axis and b is the length of the semi-minor axis.

=== General form ===
When the conic section is given in the general quadratic form
$$Ax^2 + Bxy + Cy^2 +Dx + Ey + F = 0,$$
the following formula gives the eccentricity e if the conic section is not a parabola (which has eccentricity equal to 1), not a degenerate hyperbola or degenerate ellipse, and not an imaginary ellipse:
$$e=\sqrt{\frac{2\sqrt{(A-C)^2 + B^2}}{\eta (A+C) + \sqrt{(A-C)^2 + B^2}}}$$
where $\eta = 1$ if the determinant of the 3×3 matrix
$$\begin{bmatrix}A & B/2 & D/2\\B/2 & C & E/2\\D/2&E/2&F\end{bmatrix}$$
is negative or $\eta = -1$ if that determinant is positive.

Ellipse and hyperbola with constant a and changing eccentricity e.

== Ellipses ==
The eccentricity of an ellipse is strictly less than 1. When circles (which have eccentricity 0) are counted as ellipses, the eccentricity of an ellipse is greater than or equal to 0; if circles are given a special category and are excluded from the category of ellipses, then the eccentricity of an ellipse is strictly greater than 0.

For any ellipse, let a be the length of its semi-major axis and b be the length of its semi-minor axis. In the coordinate system with origin at the ellipse's center and x-axis aligned with the major axis, points on the ellipse satisfy the equation
$$\frac{x^2}{a^2} + \frac{y^2}{b^2} = 1,$$
with foci at coordinates $(\pm c, 0)$ for $c = \sqrt{a^2 - b^2}.$

We define a number of related additional concepts (only for ellipses):

Name	Symbol	in terms of a and b	in terms of e
First eccentricity	$e$	$\sqrt{1-\frac{b^2}{a^2}}$	$e$
Second eccentricity	$e'$	$\sqrt{\frac{a^2}{b^2}-1}$	$\frac{e}{\sqrt{1-e^2}}$
Third eccentricity	$e''=\sqrt m$	$\frac{\sqrt{a^2-b^2}}{\sqrt{a^2+b^2}}$	$\frac{e}{\sqrt{2-e^2}}$
Angular eccentricity	$\alpha$	$\cos^{-1}\left(\frac{b}{a}\right)$	$\sin^{-1} e$

First eccentricity e in terms of semi-major a and semi-minor b axes: e² + (b/a)² = 1

=== Other formulae for the eccentricity of an ellipse ===
The eccentricity of an ellipse is, most simply, the ratio of the linear eccentricity c (distance between the center of the ellipse and each focus) to the length of the semimajor axis a.

$$e = \frac{c}{a}.$$

The eccentricity is also the ratio of the semimajor axis a to the distance d from the center to the directrix:
$$e = \frac{a}{d}.$$

The eccentricity can be expressed in terms of the flattening f (defined as $f = 1 - b / a$ for semimajor axis a and semiminor axis b):
$$e = \sqrt{1-(1-f)^2} = \sqrt{f(2-f)}.$$
(Flattening may be denoted by g in some subject areas if f is linear eccentricity.)

Define the maximum and minimum radii $r_\text{max}$ and $r_\text{min}$ as the maximum and minimum distances from either focus to the ellipse (that is, the distances from either focus to the two ends of the major axis). Then with semimajor axis a, the eccentricity is given by
$$e = \frac{r_\text{max}-r_\text{min}}{r_\text{max}+r_\text{min}} = \frac{r_\text{max}-r_\text{min}}{2a},$$
which is the distance between the foci divided by the length of the major axis.

== Hyperbolas ==
The eccentricity of a hyperbola can be any real number greater than 1, with no upper bound. The eccentricity of a rectangular hyperbola is $\sqrt{2}$.

For a hyperbola given by the equation $\frac{x^2}{a^2} - \frac{y^2}{b^2} = 1$ with eccentricity $e$, its conjugate hyperbola is given by $\frac{y^2}{b^2} - \frac{x^2}{a^2} = 1$. If the eccentricity of the conjugate hyperbola is $e'$, the two are related by the equation $\frac{1}{e^2} + \frac{1}{(e')^2} = 1$. This can be shown from their definitions: $e^2 = 1 + \frac{b^2}{a^2} = \frac{a^2+b^2}{a^2}$ and $(e')^2 = 1 + \frac{a^2}{b^2} = \frac{b^2+a^2}{b^2}$. From this, it follows that $\frac{1}{e^2} = \frac{a^2}{a^2+b^2}$ and $\frac{1}{(e')^2} = \frac{b^2}{a^2+b^2}$, and the sum of these two expressions is 1. From this relationship, it can be seen that one of $e$ and $e'$ must be greater than $\sqrt{2}$ and the other smaller, unless $a=b$, in which case they are both equal to $\sqrt{2}$.

== Quadrics ==
Ellipses, hyperbolas with all possible eccentricities from zero to infinity and a parabola on one cubic surface.

The eccentricity of a three-dimensional quadric is the eccentricity of a designated section of it. For example, on a triaxial ellipsoid, the meridional eccentricity is that of the ellipse formed by a section containing both the longest and the shortest axes (one of which will be the polar axis), and the equatorial eccentricity is the eccentricity of the ellipse formed by a section through the centre, perpendicular to the polar axis (i.e. in the equatorial plane). But: conic sections may occur on surfaces of higher order, too (see image).

== Celestial mechanics ==
In celestial mechanics, for bound orbits in a spherical potential, the definition above is informally generalized. When the apocenter distance is close to the pericenter distance, the orbit is said to have low eccentricity; when they are very different, the orbit is said be eccentric or having eccentricity near unity. This definition coincides with the mathematical definition of eccentricity for ellipses, in Keplerian, i.e., $1/r$ potentials.

== Analogous classifications ==
A number of classifications in mathematics use derived terminology from the classification of conic sections by eccentricity:

- Classification of elements of SL_{2}(R) as elliptic, parabolic, and hyperbolic – and similarly for classification of elements of PSL_{2}(R), the real Möbius transformations.
- Classification of discrete distributions by variance-to-mean ratio; see cumulants of some discrete probability distributions for details.
- Classification of partial differential equations is by analogy with the conic sections classification; see elliptic, parabolic and hyperbolic partial differential equations.

== See also ==
- Kepler orbits
- Eccentricity vector
- Orbital eccentricity
- Roundness (object)
- Conic constant
