= Del Buono =

Del Buono is an Italian surname that may refer to

- Candido Del Buono (1618–1676), Italian maker of scientific instruments
- Federica Del Buono (born 1994), Italian middle-distance runner
- Gianni Del Buono (born 1943), Italian middle-distance runner, father of Federica
- Paolo Del Buono (1625–1659), Italian maker of scientific instruments, brother of Candido
- Marco del Buono (1402–1489), painter and woodworker

== See also ==
- Buono (surname)
