= Buono (surname) =

Buono is an Italian surname. Notable people with the surname include:

- Angelo Buono Jr. (1934–2002), American serial killer
- Barbara Buono (born 1953), American Democratic Party politician
- Cara Buono (born 1971), American actress
- Cosmo Buono, American pianist
- John L. Buono (born 1943), American Republican Party politician
- Victor Buono (1938–1982), American actor and comic
- Wally Buono (born 1950), Canadian head coach, general manager and alternate governor
