= BG Geminorum =

Star in the constellation Gemini

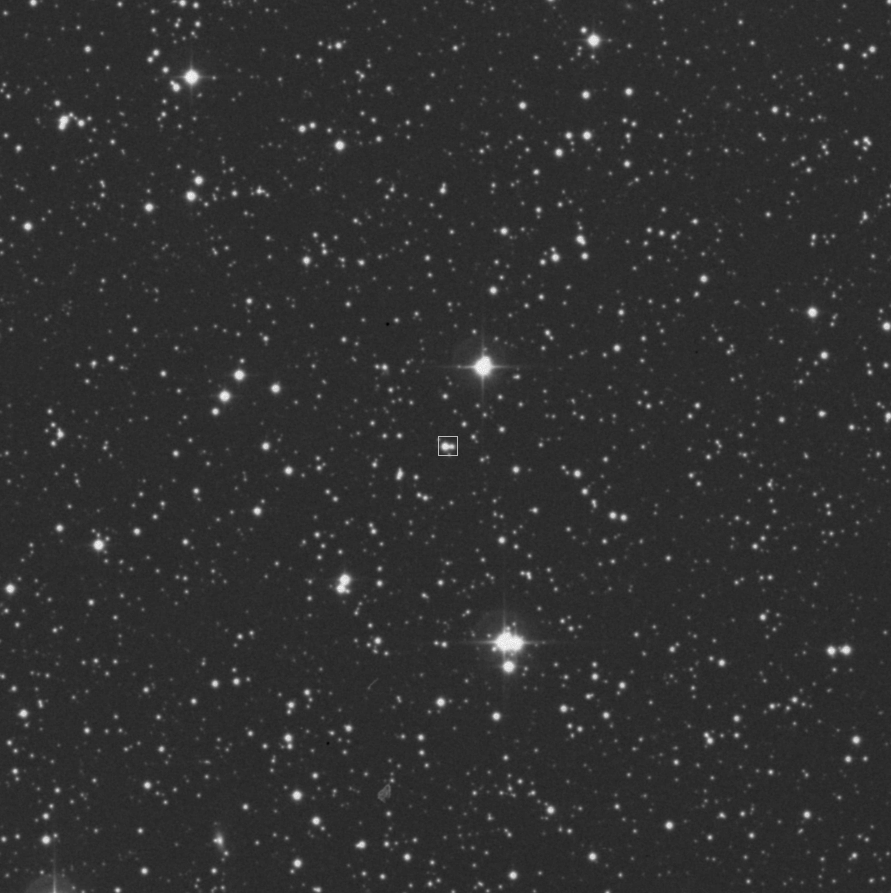
- Satellite image of binary star system BG Geminorum

Observation data Epoch J2000.0 Equinox ICRS
- Constellation: Gemini
- Right ascension: 06^{h} 03^{m} 30.81^{s}
- Declination: +27° 41′ 50.6″
- Apparent magnitude (V): 12.9 - 13.6

Characteristics
- Spectral type: K0I
- Apparent magnitude (g): 12.83
- Variable type: eclipsing

Astrometry
| Proper motion (μ) | RA: 0.209±0.021 mas/yr Dec.: −0.385±0.015 mas/yr |
| Parallax (π) | 0.2057±0.0197 mas |
| Distance | 16,000 ± 2,000 ly (4,900 ± 500 pc) |

Orbit
| Period (P) | 91.645 days |
| Semi-major axis (a) | >0.63 ± 0.04 AU |
| Inclination (i) | >80° |

Details

Supergiant
| Mass | >0.7 M_{☉} |
| Temperature | 4,500 K |

Black hole or class B
| Mass | >3.5 M_{☉} |

Other designations
- BG Geminorum, 2MASS J06033081+2741506

Database references
| SIMBAD | data |

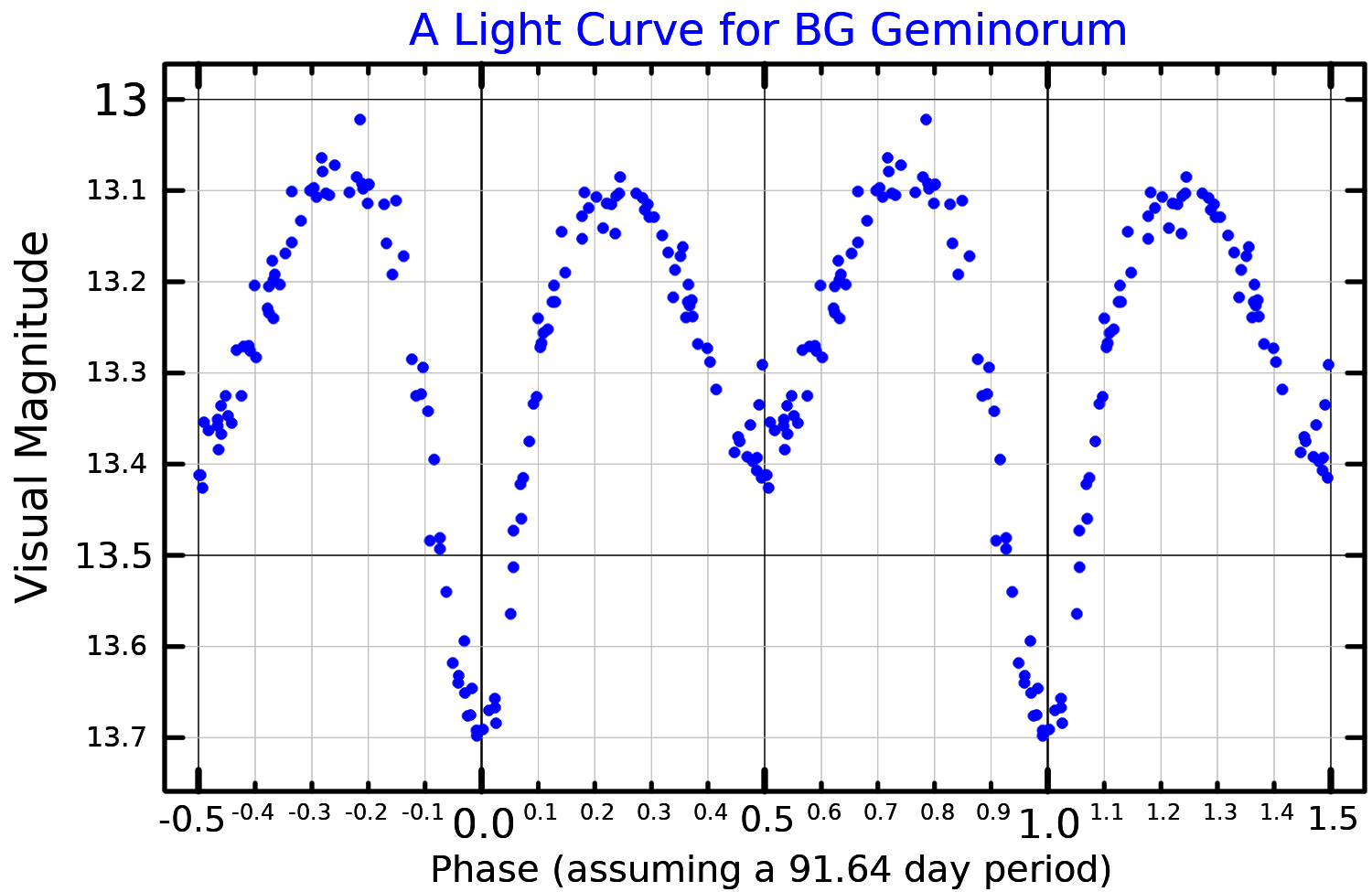
A visual band light curve for BG Geminorum, plotted from ASAS-SN data

BG Geminorum is an eclipsing binary star system in the constellation Gemini. It consists of a K0 supergiant with a more massive but unseen companion. The companion is likely to be either a black hole or class B star. Material from the K0 star is being transferred to an accretion disk surrounding the unidentified object.
