= Candido del Buono =

Italian scientific instrument maker

Candido del Buono (22 July 1618, Florence – 19 September 1676, Campoli) was an Italian scientific instrument maker.

Candido del Buono, a Florentine priest, attended Famiano Michelini's (1604–1665) mathematics lectures with his brother Paolo Del Buono (1625-1659). Del Buono was the Chamberlain of the Hospital of Santa Maria Nuova in Florence and a member of the Accademia del Cimento, where he presented several instruments of his invention. He invented an aerometer and constructed a device to measure the density of vapor. There is no clear documentary evidence of whether he or his other brother Anton Maria Del Buono was the inventor of the arcicanna, a complex system that solved some typical problems of large telescopes in the second half of the 17th century.
