= Paolo del Buono =

Paolo del Buono (1625-1659) was an Italian experimental scientist and scientific instrument maker who studied under Gallileo.

== Biography ==
A Florentine disciple of Famiano Michelini (1604-1665), Paolo del Buono received his doctorate from the University of Pisa in 1649. In 1655, he and his brother Candido went to Germany to enter the service of Ferdinand III (Emperor from 1637 to 1657) and was appointed master of the mint at the Imperial Mint. During his stay, with his student Geminiano Montanari (1633-1687), he visited the imperial mines in the Carpathian Mountains and invented a method of extracting water. Del Buono performed wide-ranging research in physics and experimental science. Paolo and his brother Candido del Buono (1618-1676) both belonged to the Accademia del Cimento, with whom Paolo corresponded from Germany.

He is also noted for an experiment in 1657 which showed the incompressibility of water where water compressed in a gold shell by a screw seeped through pores in the gold, and for introducing into Tuscany an Egyptian method of raising chickens whereby the eggs are hatched by gradually introducing heat to them. He also studied air and how it could be expanded or compressed.

== Link ==
- Museo Galileo. "Paolo Del Buono". Catalogue of the Museo Galileo's Instruments on Display. catalogue.museogalileo.it
