= Gianantonio Davia =

Italian prelate of the Catholic Church (1660–1740)

His Eminence Gianantonio Davia
- Bishop Emeritus of Rimini; Cardinal-Priest of San Lorenzo in Lucina; Prefect of the Congregation of the Index
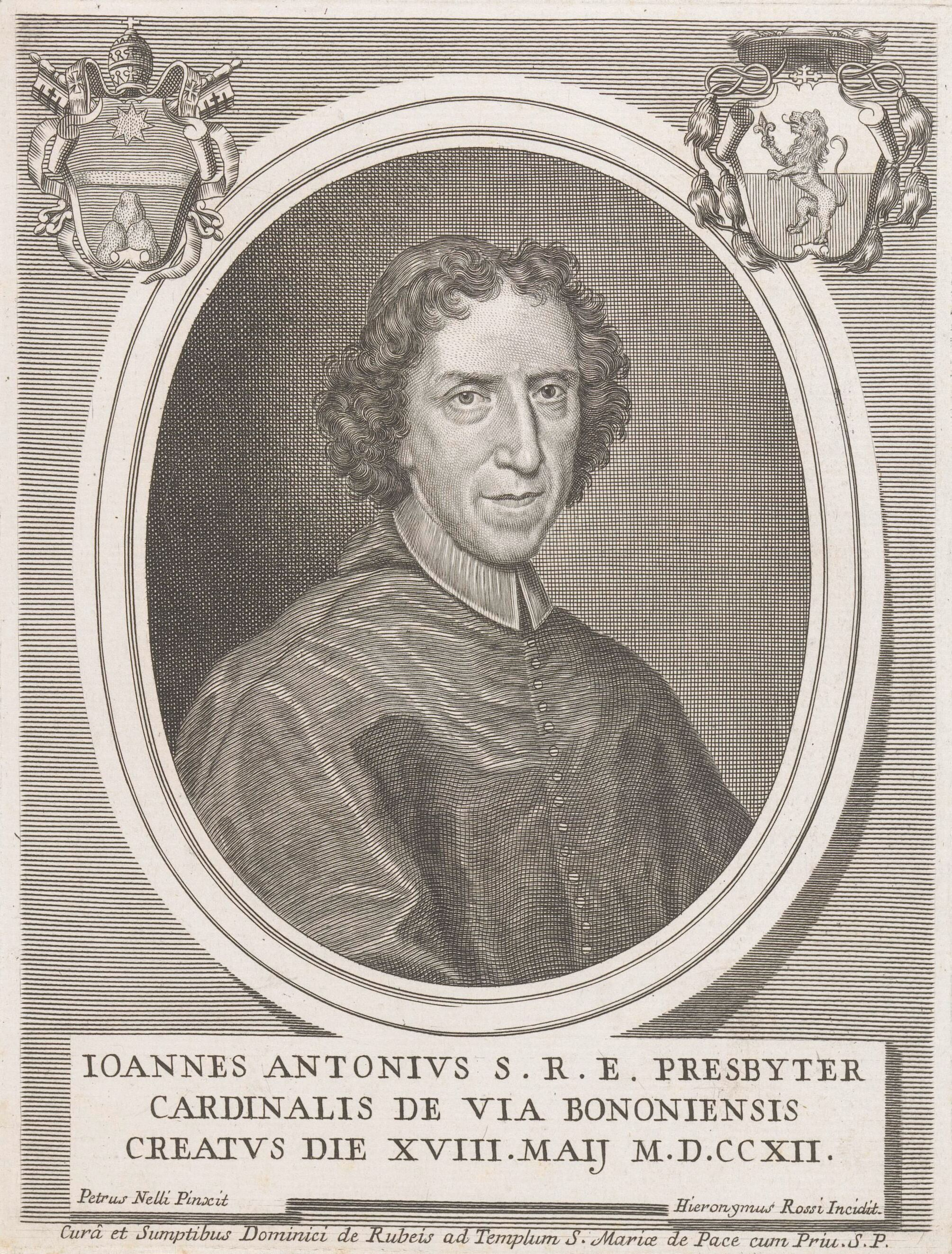
- Church: Catholic Church
- Diocese: Rimini
- Previous posts: Apostolic Internuncio to Belgium (1687–1690); Titular Archbishop of Thebae (1690–1698); Apostolic Nuncio to Germany (1690–1696); Apostolic Nuncio to Poland (1696–1700); Archbishop (Personal Title) of Rimini, Italy (1698–1726); Apostolic Nuncio to Austria (1700–1706); Cardinal-Priest of San Callisto (1713–1725); Cardinal-Priest of San Pietro in Vincoli (1725–1737)

Orders
- Rank: Cardinal-Priest

Personal details
- Born: 13 October 1660 Bologna, Papal States
- Died: 11 January 1740 (aged 79) Rome, Papal States
- Buried: San Lorenzo in Lucina
- Education: University of Bologna (philosophy); Doctorate in utroque iure, both canon and civil law, in Turin.

Ordination history
History
Episcopal consecration
- Principal consecrator: Humbertus Guilielmus de Precipiano
- Co-consecrators: Réginald Cools, Jean-Ferdinand Van Beughem
Cardinalate
- Elevated by: Clement XI
Episcopal succession
Bishops consecrated by Gianantonio Davia as principal consecrator
- Otto Wilhelm von Bronckhorst zu Gronsfeld: 1693
- Jan Dłużewski: 1696
- Teodor Andrzej Potocki: 1699
- Fulvio Salvi: 1713

Gianantonio Davia (13 October 1660 – 11 January 1740) was an Italian prelate of the Catholic Church, who served as an apostolic nuncio, bishop/archbishop, cardinal, and secretary of a major department (congregration) of the Roman Curia.

== Biography ==
Davia was born in Bologna to a prominent family, whose name is also spelled as D'Avia and De Via. He was educated in both canon and civil law at the University of Bologna, and early in life, served as a magistrate and a soldier in the war between Venice and the Ottomans in 1684, where he took part in the siege of Santa Maura. He then moved to Rome, where he rose rapidly in the ecclesiastical ranks, despite never attending seminary. He served as nuncio in Cologne, Poland, and ultimately Austria by 1700, only to be expelled from Vienna after the death of Emperor Leopold I by his successor, Emperor Joseph I, in May 1706. On May 18, 1712; he was named a cardinal. He participated in the conclaves of 1721, 1724, and 1730.

In 1727, he was named Protector of Scotland, and minister of England to the exiled of Stuart pretender, James Francis Edward Stuart in Rome in April 1728. His brother, Virgilio, had been created Earl of Almond by the exiled James Stuart in 1698. Davia was accused of supporting Jansenism on several occasions. He died in Rome and was buried at San Lorenzo in Lucina.

Cardinal Davia was particularly interested in scientific research. He had studied with Marcello Malpighi and Geminiano Montanari during his student days in Bologna. He participated in the lively scientific discussions of Montanari's Accademia della Traccia, continuing the academy in his own home when Montanari left Bologna.

In 1681, he visited the Royal Society and the French Academy of Sciences.

In 1725, Cardinal Davia donated to the Academy of Sciences of the Institute of Bologna a pendulum regulator of fine quality, a Newtonian reflecting telescope, and a quadrant for use at the Observatory of Bologna.
