= Thiele−Innes elements =

Quantities used in astronomy

The Thiele−Innes elements, named after Thorvald N. Thiele (1838–1910) and Robert T.A. Innes (1861–1933), are auxiliary quantities that can be used to calculate the relative apparent position of components of a binary star system.

== Introduction ==
For (amateur) astronomers who want to observe double stars, it is useful to know how far apart the two components of the double star are: the narrower the distance, the more difficult it is to see the two stars separated. Available tables usually only give the separation at one single moment. But as the two stars of a binary revolve around each other, their apparent distance varies continually. The Thiele-Innes formalism is an efficient method to calculate how the distance, and the so-called position angle, or orientation of the line connecting the two stars, vary over time.

The procedure essentially consists of two steps:

• One step is to calculate the relative position of the stars in their real mutual orbit at a given time.

• The other step is to project this position onto the celestial sphere. This second step is performed by means of the Thiele-Innes elements.

The efficiency of the Thiele-Innes method stems from the fact that the Thiele-Innes elements that are needed for the second step have to be evaluated only once.

== Orbital elements ==
Three-dimensional sketch of the apparent (a) and real (b) orbit of a double star (Alpha Centauri). Orbital elements Ω, ω, i and a are indicated; P is the periastron, A the apastron. The stellar disks are not to scale. (North is up; a telescope would probably show the image upside down, so with North down.)

The orbit of a binary star and the relative position at any moment of its components (specifically the position of the weaker component B relative to the brighter component A) are characterized by a set of seven orbital elements. These elements are (as an example numerical values are given for Alpha Centauri):

symbol	orbital element	Alpha Centauri
P	period of revolution	79.910 ± 0.011 years
a	semi-major axis (in arcseconds)	17″.570 ± 0″.022
i	inclination between plane of true orbit and plane of its projection on the celestial sphere	79°.205 ± 0°.041
Ω	ascending node: position angle of intersection line between true and apparent orbits	204°.850 ± 0°.084
T	instant (Julian year) of the stars' passage through the periastron	1875.660 ± 0.012
e	numerical eccentricity of the orbit	0.51790 ± 0.00076
ω	angle between ascending node and periastron, counted in the direction of motion	231°.650 ± 0°.076

== Definition of the Thiele-Innes elements ==
The Thiele-Innes elements are constants that describe how the real orbit in space is projected onto the celestial sphere. They are functions of the orbital elements a, Ω, ω, and i (the so-called classical or Campbell elements), and are defined as follows:

A = a · (cos ω cos Ω − sin ω sin Ω cos i)
B = a · (cos ω sin Ω + sin ω cos Ω cos i)
F = a · (−sin ω cos Ω − cos ω sin Ω cos i)
G = a · (−sin ω sin Ω + cos ω cos Ω cos i)

For Alpha Centauri one finds from the orbital elements above:

A = 8″.8076
B = 6″.9231
F = −13″.3613
G = −3″.9378

== From elements to position ==
The time (t)-dependent part of the Kepler orbit of the binary star follows from the three remaining orbital elements, e, T and P. First one calculates the mean anomaly M(t) at a time t:

M = (t − T) · 360°/P (modulo 360°)

Next, find the eccentric anomaly E, such that E = M + e sin(E) (Kepler's equation).

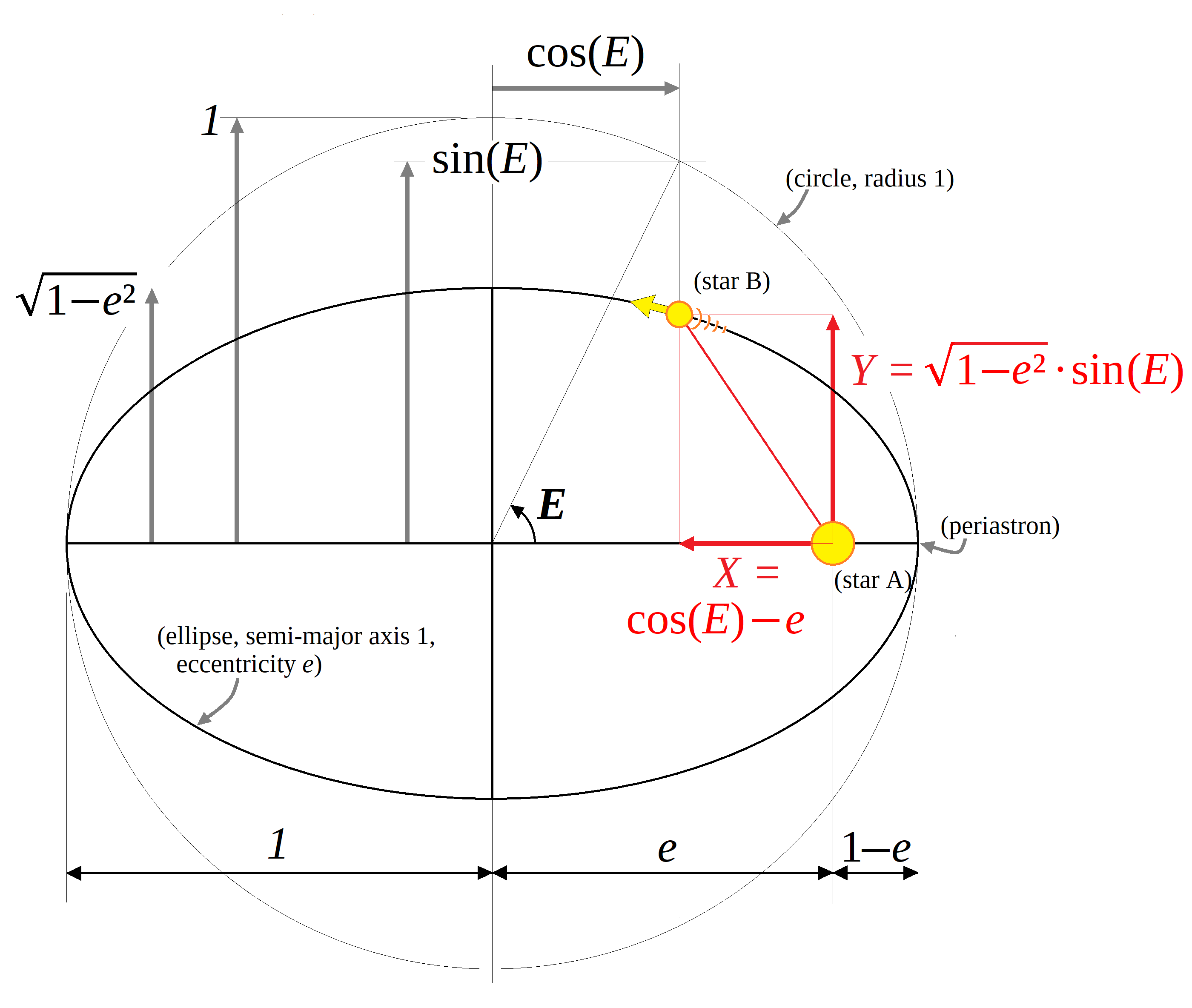
Definition of the rectangular coordinates X and Y for the Kepler orbit of a binary star (Thiele-Innes formalism)

From E and the orbital eccentricity e follow the rectangular coordinates within the Kepler orbit:

X = cos(E) − e
Y = √(1−e²) · sin(E)

The apparent position (x,y) of the double star, in rectangular coordinates, as seen from Earth, can then be calculated by means of:

x = A·X + F·Y
y = B·X + G·Y

(positive x is North, positive y is East).

This can be elegantly written as a simple matrix multiplication:

$$\binom{x}{y} = \begin{pmatrix} A & F \\ B & G \end{pmatrix} \binom{cos (E(t))-e}{\sqrt{1-e^2} . sin (E(t))}$$

From x and y follow the phase angle ϑ (theta; measured counterclockwise in degrees from North) and the apparent distance ρ (rho; in arc seconds):

ρ = √ [x² + y²]
ϑ = arctan(y/x) (modulo 360°) (if x>0), or

arctan(y/x) + 180° (if x<0);
if x=0, then ϑ = 90° (if y>0) or ϑ = 270° (if y<0)

== A calculation ==
Example: Alpha Centauri. At the beginning of the year 2010 (t = 2010.0) one finds:

M = 245°.211
E = 224°.436
X = cos(E) − e = −1.23193
Y = √(1−e²) · sin(E) = −0.59891
x = AX + FY = −2″.848
y = BX + GY = −6″.170
ρ = √ [x² + y²] = 6″.796
ϑ = arctan(y/x) + 180° = 245°.222

== Popularity ==
Historically, the Thiele-Innes elements simplified various calculations regarding the orbits of binary stars. Using the Thiele-Innes method has also long been attractive because of the fact that the elements A, B, F, and G are constants that need to be evaluated only once; thereafter, in an age before the modern computer, a time series of E(t), and thus a full series of positions (ρ,ϑ), could be calculated efficiently.
