= Geminiano Montanari =

Italian astronomer (1633–1687)

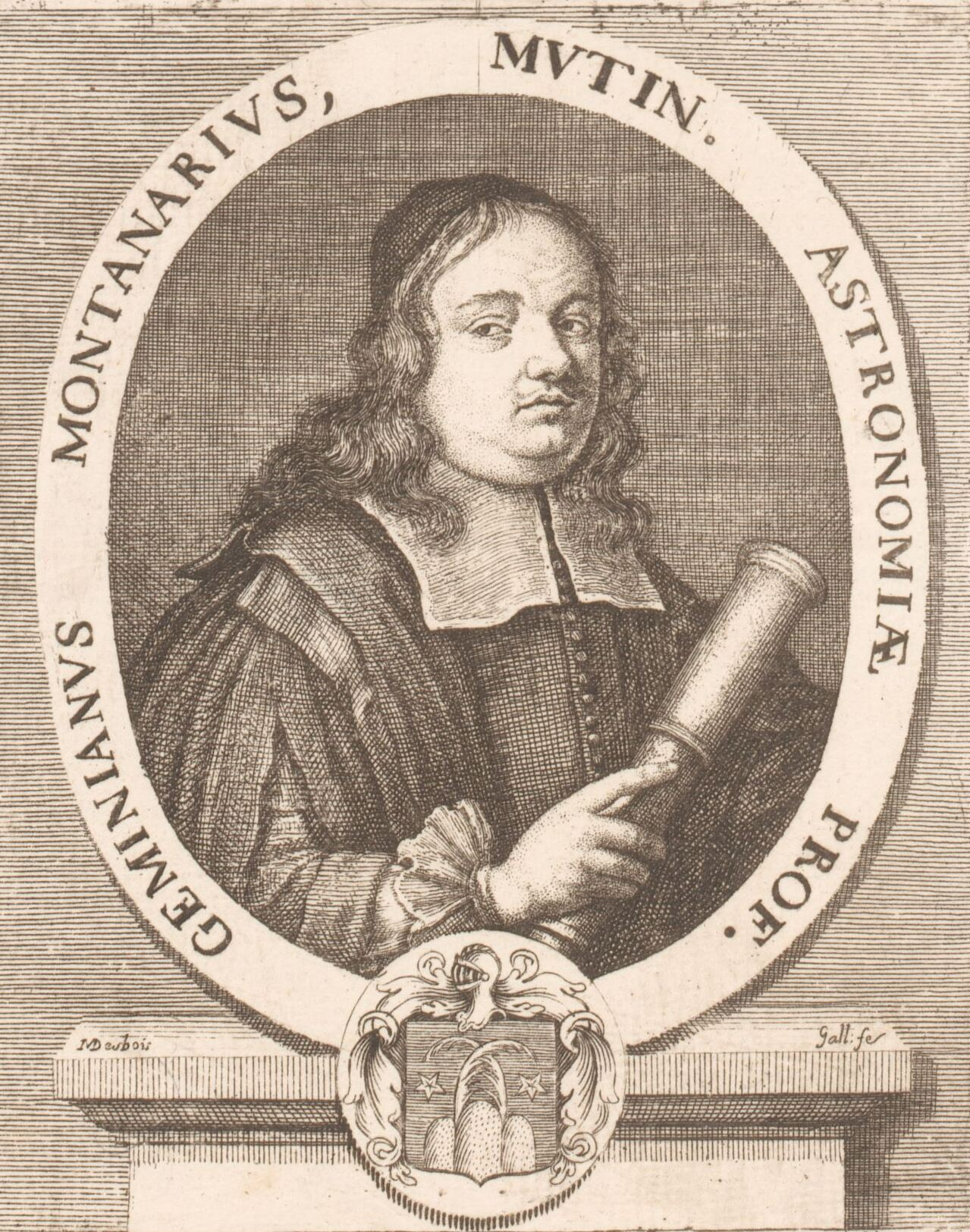
- Born: 1 June 1633; Modena, Duchy of Modena and Reggio
- Died: 13 October 1687 (aged 54); Padua, Republic of Venice
- Education: University of Salzburg
- Known for: Discovery of the variations in brightness of Algol
- Scientific career
- Fields: Astronomy; Mathematics; Physics; Economics
- Workplaces: University of Bologna; University of Padua
- Notable students: Domenico Guglielmini; Francesco Bianchini; Gianantonio Davia; Luigi Ferdinando Marsili

Geminiano Montanari (1 June 1633 – 13 October 1687) was an Italian astronomer, lens-maker, and proponent of the experimental approach to science. He was a member of various learned academies, notably the Accademia dei Gelati. Montanari's famous students include Domenico Guglielmini, Francesco Bianchini, Gianantonio Davia and Luigi Ferdinando Marsili.

He is best known for his observation, made around 1667, that the second-brightest star (called Algol as derived from its name in Arabic) in the constellation of Perseus varied in brightness. It is likely that others had observed this effect before, but Montanari was the first named astronomer to record it. The star's names in Arabic, Hebrew and other languages, all of which have a meaning of "ghoul" or "demon", imply that its unusual behaviour had long been recognised.

== Biography ==
Montanari was born in Modena on June 1, 1633. The son of Giovanni Montanari and Margherita Zanasi, he was left fatherless at age ten. Montanari began his studies in Modena. At twenty he went to Florence to study law; he remained there for 3 years. In Florence he participated in the observations of the phases of Saturn made after the publication of Huygens' Systema Saturnium. In 1656 Montanari left Florence and moved to Salzburg, Austria, where he took a law degree in the same year. Thanks to the influence of Paolo del Buono, one of Galileo's last direct disciples and Florentine diplomat at the imperial court, he pursued the mathematical studies begun in Modena at the age of thirteen.

At the beginning of 1661 Montanari became court philosopher and mathematician in Modena. In the meantime the Modenese scientist had made acquaintance with Marquis Cornelio Malvasia, an influential senator and patron of science of Bologna who had built in his country house near Modena an astronomical observatory. Montanari helped Malvasia to complete his Ephemerides (Modena, 1662) and, after the death of Alfonso d'Este in July 1662, he left the court of Modena and pursued his astronomical studies and observations thanks to the patronage of the marquis. Malvasia also managed to get his protégé a chair of mathematics at the University of Bologna, to which Montanari was appointed by the Senate in December 1664. Montanari lectured in the afternoon chair while the Bolognese Pietro Mengoli, a renowned disciple of Cavalieri and a parish priest, occupied the morning chair. A third mathematical lectureship was held by Giovanni Domenico Cassini, a close friend of Montanari's.

In Bologna Montanari drew an accurate map of the Moon using an ocular micrometer of his own making. He also made observations on capillarity and other problems in statics, and suggested that the viscosity of a liquid depended on the shape of its molecules. In 1665 Montanari organized the Accademia della Traccia, the precursor to the Accademia degli Inquieti and the Academy of Sciences of the Institute of Bologna. The academy was established the year after Montanari's call to the University, and in the first two years of activity it met at the house of a Bolognese patrician, the Abbot Carlo Antonio Sampieri. From about 1667-1668 to 1677, the meetings were held at Montanari's home. Montanari was a keen astronomical observer, as demonstrated by the observations he made of the meteor that crossed the sky of central Italy on 21 March 1676 or those of the comet of 1682, the same observed by Edmond Halley. Montanari's observations of the great comet of 1680 are mentioned twice in the third volume of Newton's Principia. Montanari published several tracts intended to discredit astrological prognostication. In 1675, he perpetrated a deliberate hoax by writing an astrological almanac entirely at random, to show that predictions made by chance were as likely to be fulfilled as those made by astrology. In the period shortly after Galileo Galilei, experimentalists like Montanari were engaged in a battle against the more mystical views of scientists such as Donato Rossetti, a pupil of Borelli. Montanari, on the contrary, drew a clear line of metaphysical neutrality, based on a sharp distinction between metaphysics and natural philosophy.

In July 1678 Montanari was appointed to the new Paduan chair of astronomy and meteorology. Almost all records of this period of his life have been lost. A letter survives from 1682 recording a sighting of Halley's Comet. He also wrote on economics, observing that demand for a particular commodity was fixed, and making comments on coinage and the value of money (1683).

Montanari was a close friend of the architect Guarino Guarini. In 1678 Guarini helped organize Montanari's debate with the latter's archenemy Donato Rossetti in Turin.

A crater on the Moon, at 45.8S, 20.6W, is named after him.

== Economic works and theories ==
To students of economics Montanari is known by his two works on coins, written abont 1680, and published seventy years later by Argelati in his collection of works on coins, and afterwards reproduced in the collection of Pietro Custodi. These works possess much merit notwithstanding the evident traces of the influence of Bodin – an influence greatly felt by all thinkers at that period.

Fluent and animated in style, Montanari freely criticises the mistaken views held in his day on the coinage question, and the injurious effect of alterations in coins, and the raising their nominal value; and points out the rules which should be observed in coining money at the mints. His investigations on money necessarily lead him to an examination of the question of value. He combats the idea of an invariable relation of the value between gold and silver asserted by Bodin and Scaruffi. He reduces the laws of value to the element of scarcity – understanding scarcity not as absolute, but relative to the extent of the demand.

In his researches, says Graziani, Montanari succeeds in explaining all the general phenomena of value, though without thoroughly understanding the intricate and difficult subject – the value of money.

== Publications ==
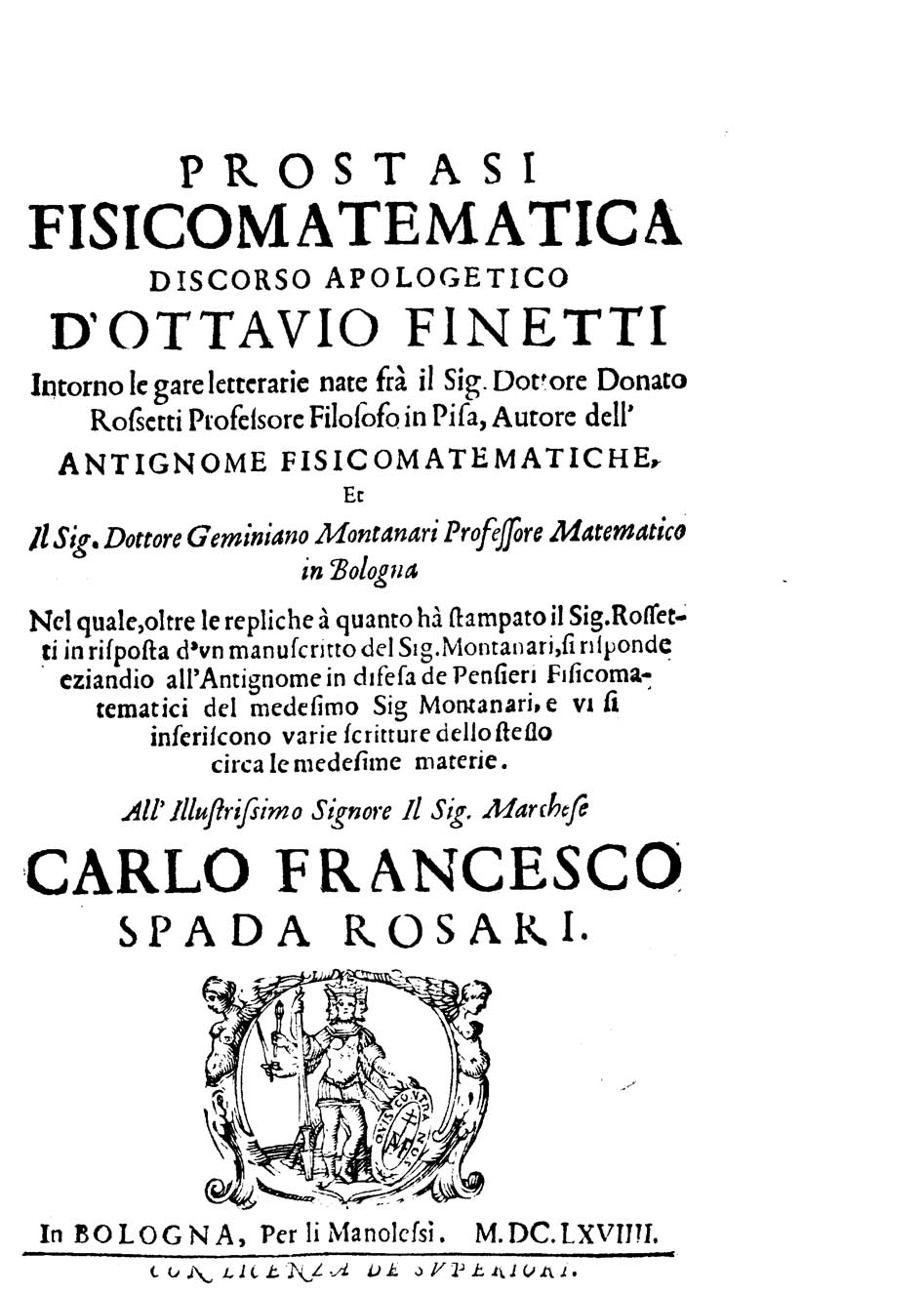
Prostasi fisicomatematica, 1669

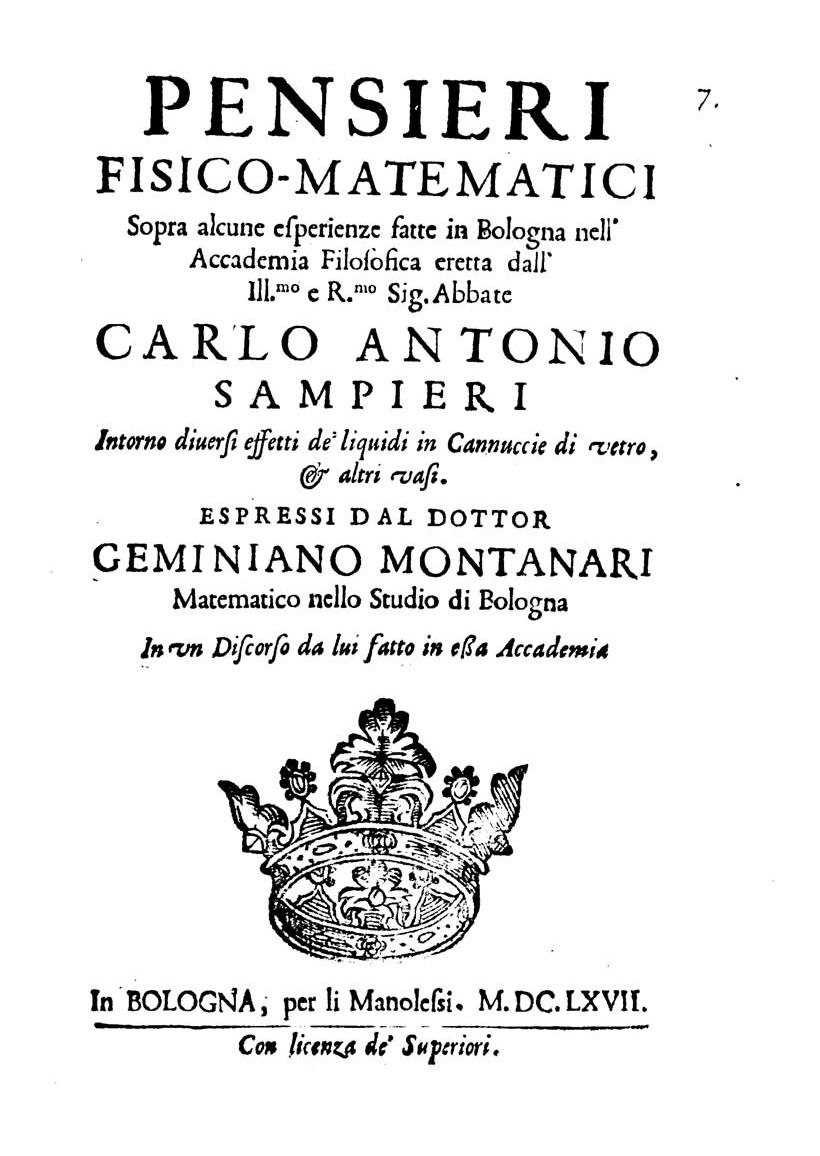
Pensieri fisico-matematici intorno diversi effetti de' liquidi in cannuccie di vetro e altri vasi, 1667

- Pensieri fisico-matematici (1667)
- La Livella Diottrica (The Spirit Level) (1674)
- Trattato mercantile delle monete (1680)
- Cometes Bononiae observatus anno 1664 et 1665 (in Latin). Bologna: Giovanni Battista Ferroni. 1665.
- Ephemeris lansbergiana ad longitudinem almae studiorum matris Bononiae ad annum 1666 (in Latin). Bologna: Giovanni Battista Ferroni. 1665.
- Pensieri fisico-matematici intorno diversi effetti de' liquidi in cannuccie di vetro e altri vasi. In Bologna: Emilio Maria & fratelli Manolessi. 1667.
- Prostasi fisicomatematica. In Bologna: Emilio Maria & fratelli Manolessi. 1669.
- Speculazioni fisiche sopra gli effetti di que' vetri temprati che rotti in una parte si risolvono in polvere. In Bologna: Emilio Maria & fratelli Manolessi. 1671.
- Copia di lettera scritta all'illustrissimo Gio[vanni] Giuseppe Orsi. In Bologna: Emilio Maria & fratelli Manolessi. 1676.
- Fiamma volante gran meteora veduta sopra l'Italia la sera del 31 marzo 1676. In Bologna: Emilio Maria & fratelli Manolessi. 1676.
- Lezione academica havuta nell'Academia di s.a. reale in Torino il giorno 5 marzo 1678. In Torino, & in Bologna: Emilio Maria & fratelli Manolessi. 1678.
- Copia di due lettere scritte all'illustrissimo signor Antonio Magliabechi sopra i moti, e le apparenze delle due comete ultimamente apparse sul fine di nouembre 1680, nelle costellazioni di Vergine e Libra, e sul fine di decembre in quella di Capricorno (in Italian). Venezia: Andrea Poletti. 1681.
- Astrologia convinta di falso col mezzo di nuove esperienze e ragioni fisico-astronomiche, o' sia La caccia del frugnuolo. In Venetia: Francesco Nicolini. 1685.
- Forze d'Eolo (in Italian). Parma: Andrea Poletti. 1694.
- Discorso sopra la tromba parlante del signor dottore Geminiano Montanari professore delle matematiche in Padova. Aggiontovi un trattato postumo del mare Adriatico, e sua corrente esaminata, co la naturalezza de fiumi scoperta, e con nove forme di ripari corretta. In Venetia: per Girolamo Albrizzi. 1715.

== Bibliography ==
- "Montanari, Geminiano". Dictionary of Political Economy. Vol. 2. London: Macmillan and Company. 1894. p. 808.
- Tabarroni, Giorgio (1974). "Montanari, Geminiano". In Charles Coulston Gillispie (ed.). Dictionary of Scientific Biography. Vol. 9. New York: Charles Scribner's Sons. pp. 484–487.
