= 107 Aquarii =

Star in the constellation Aquarius

Observation data Epoch J2000.0 (ICRS) Equinox J2000.0 (ICRS)
- Constellation: Aquarius
- Right ascension: 23^{h} 46^{m} 00.92254^{s}
- Declination: −18° 40′ 42.0313″
- Apparent magnitude (V): +5.305 (5.72/6.72)

Characteristics
- Spectral type: F2 III + F2 V
- U−B color index: +0.141
- B−V color index: +0.287

Astrometry
Radial velocity (R_{v})	−0.70 km/s
Absolute magnitude (M_{V})	+0.97

A
Proper motion (μ)	RA: +132.908 mas/yr Dec.: +16.011 mas/yr
Parallax (π)	16.1378±0.2169 mas
Distance	202 ± 3 ly (62.0 ± 0.8 pc)

B
Proper motion (μ)	RA: +139.256 mas/yr Dec.: +10.050 mas/yr
Parallax (π)	20.0193±0.3991 mas
Distance	163 ± 3 ly (50.0 ± 1.0 pc)

Details

A
Radius	2.43 R_{☉}
Luminosity	16.647 L_{☉}
Temperature	7,482 K
Rotational velocity (v sin i)	70 km/s

B
Radius	1.47 R_{☉}
Luminosity	4.421 L_{☉}
Temperature	6,889 K

Other designations
- BD−19 6506, HD 223024, HIP 117218, HR 9002, SAO 165867, WDS J23460-1841

Database references
SIMBAD	data

107 Aquarii (abbreviated 107 Aqr) is a double star in the equatorial constellation of Aquarius. 107 Aquarii is the Flamsteed designation, although it also bears the Bayer designation i^{2} Aquarii. The pair has an angular separation of 6.787 arcseconds. They have a combined apparent visual magnitude of +5.305, with individual magnitudes of 5.72 and 6.72. The annual parallax shift measured for the two components is 16.1 mas and 20.0 mas respectively, although with significant statistical margins of error and flags for potential unreliability of both values. This indicates the system may be at a distance of 160–200 light-years (49–61 parsecs) from Earth.
