= V Hydrae =

Variable star in the constellation Hydra

- Location of V Hydrae (circled)

Observation data Epoch J2000 Equinox ICRS
- Constellation: Hydra
- Right ascension: 10^{h} 51^{m} 37.26159^{s}
- Declination: −21° 15′ 00.3339″
- Apparent magnitude (V): 6.0 - 12.3

Characteristics
- Evolutionary stage: AGB
- Spectral type: C6,3e-C7,5e(N6e)
- B−V color index: +5.43
- Variable type: SRa

Astrometry
Radial velocity (R_{v})	−14.80 km/s
Proper motion (μ)	RA: −16.19 mas/yr Dec.: +2 mas/yr
Parallax (π)	2.3095±0.1080 mas
Distance	1,410 ± 70 ly (430 ± 20 pc)
Absolute magnitude (M_{V})	−3.5 to +1.8

Orbit
Period (P)	17.45+0.34 −0.29 yr
Semi-major axis (a)	11.2+1.2 −1.5 AU
Eccentricity (e)	0.024+0.027 −0.017
Inclination (i)	37.7+2.2 −2.0°
Longitude of the node (Ω)	159.7+43.0 −3.3°
Periastron epoch (T)	JD = 2,458,684+2,128 −2,582
Argument of periastron (ω) (secondary)	343+147 −122°

Details

A
Mass	1.9±1.0 M_{☉}
Radius	420–430 R_{☉}
Luminosity	18,000 L_{☉}
Surface gravity (log g)	−0.5 cgs
Temperature	2,650 K
Rotational velocity (v sin i)	11 - 14 km/s

B
Mass	2.63+0.63 −0.69 M_{☉}
Radius	1.5 R_{☉}
Temperature	9,950 K

Other designations
- V Hya, BD−20°3283, HIP 53085, 2MASS J10513724-2115002, IRAS 10491-2059, WDS J10516-2115

Database references
SIMBAD	data

V Hydrae (V Hya) is a carbon star in the constellation Hydra. It is so-far the only star discovered in the Milky Way galaxy to have plasma ejections/eruptions on a grand scale that could be caused by its near, unseen companion.

== Variability ==
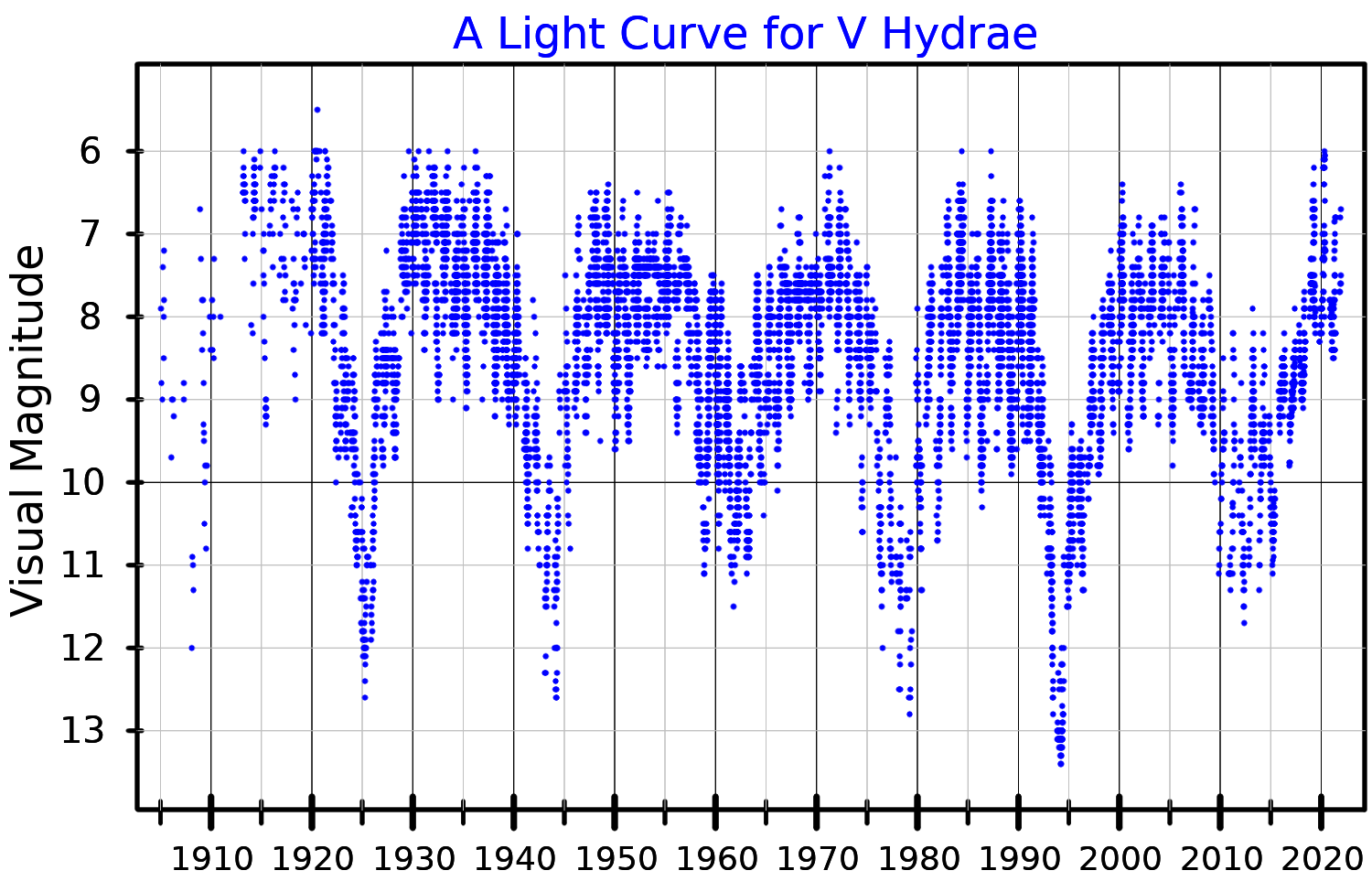
A visual band light curve for V Hydrae, plotted from AAVSO data

In the 1870s, Benjamin Apthorp Gould suspected that the star is variable, based on observations with opera glasses. In May 1888, Seth Carlo Chandler confirmed that the star is variable, citing observations from 1797 through 1879, and he derived a period of 535 days, which is very close to the currently accepted value. Later that year, Chandler included the star with its variable star designation, V Hydrae, in his Catalogue of Variable Stars.

V Hydrae is a semiregular variable star of type SRa, sometimes considered to be a Mira variable. It pulsates with a period of 530 days and a brightness range of 1-2 magnitudes, but also shows deep fades at intervals of about 17.5 years when it may drop below magnitude 12.

== Evolutionary stage ==
V Hydrae is a late carbon star, an asymptotic giant branch (AGB) star that has dredged up sufficient material from its interior to have more carbon in its atmosphere than oxygen. The rate of mass loss from V Hydrae indicates that it is almost at the end of the AGB stage and about to lose its atmosphere completely and form a planetary nebula. It is sometimes considered to be a post-AGB object.

== Companions ==
V Hydrae has a visible binary companion 46" distant. It is a magnitude 11.5 K0 giant.

V Hydrae also has an unseen companion inferred by its ultraviolet excess and radial-velocity monitoring. It has been suggested that the steep drops in brightness every 17 years or so are caused by obscuration by a cloud associated with the companion passing in front of the giant star. A study in 2024 used astrometry and radial velocity measurements and constrained the orbital parameters of the companion, as well as its mass, being 36% larger than the mass of the primary and equivalent to 2.6 times the mass of the Sun.

== Bullets ==
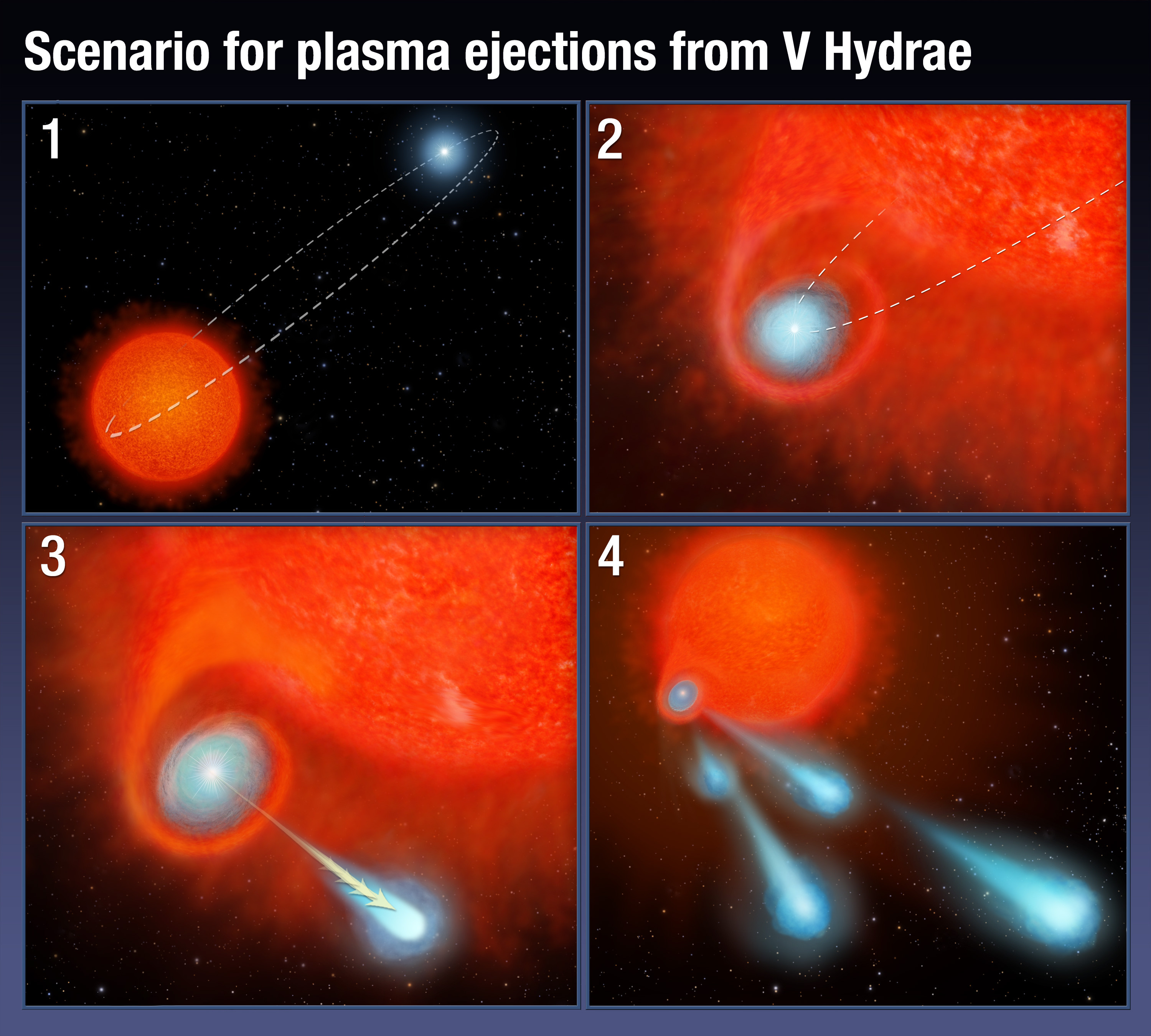
Artist's illustration of plasma ejections from V Hydrae.

V Hydrae has high-speed outflows of material collimated into jets, and also a disk of material around the star. Since the star itself is considered to be at the end of the Asymptotic Giant Branch (AGB) phase of evolution and starting to generate a planetary nebula, the mechanism for the ejection of this material can give key insights to the formation of planetary nebulae. Microwave spectra of rotational transitions of carbon monoxide show that portions of the envelope, probably the jets, are moving away from the star at 200 km/sec. This is far faster than the ~15 km/sec stellar wind that is typically seen around AGB stars.
