= Cosmo Buono =

American pianist, native of New Jersey

Cosmo Buono is an American pianist, native of New Jersey who completed his piano studies at New York University, Bard College, and The Juilliard School. As a soloist he has been heard in North America, Europe, and Japan, including performances with the Munich Philharmonic and the Danish State Radio Orchestra. He is also the founder of Alexander and Buono International.

== Sources ==
- https://www.nytimes.com/1992/11/29/nyregion/music-duo-pianists-offering-rare-transcriptions.html?scp=2&sq=Cosmo+Buono&st=nyt
- https://www.nytimes.com/1982/06/06/arts/piano-bradshaw-buono-duo.html
- https://www.nytimes.com/1999/12/31/movies/classical-music-and-dance-guide.html
