= Famiano Michelini =

Italian Catholic priest and mathematician

Famiano Michelini SchP (31 August 1604 – 20 January 1665) was an Italian mathematician, mainly interested in hydraulics.

== Life ==
Born in Rome in 1604, Famiano Michelini studied in Genoa among the Order of Poor Clerics Regular of the Mother of God of the Pious Schools, his math teacher was Antonio Santini. In 1629 he went in Florence to found the first piarists school. Galileo Galilei gave him a covering letter. He was in correspondence for many years with Galileo and other scientists. He taught mathematics in Pisa from 1635 to 1655, after Vincenzo Renieri; in 1635 Michelini also taught astronomy to Leopoldo de' Medici. He was then vicar of the Bishop of Patti, Sicily and he became the mathematician of Cardinal Leopoldo de' Medici, who financed his research.

Famiano Michelini was the first scientist to hypothesize a theory on active defense against corrosion of the river banks through the use of sprockets and he was never invited to the Cimento Academy. He died in Florence in 1665.

== Works ==
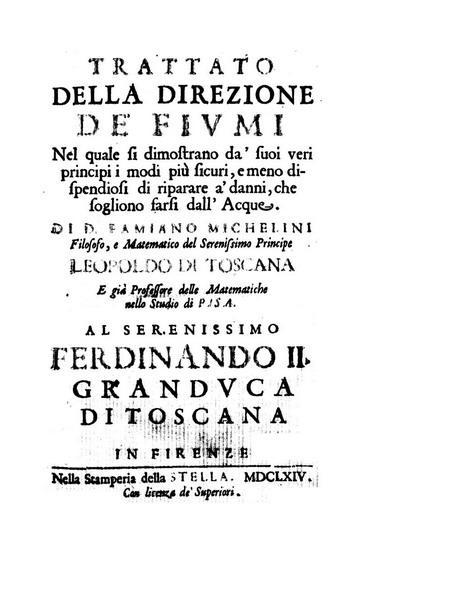
Trattato della direzione de' fiumi (1664)

- Trattato della direzione de' fiumi (in Italian). Florence: Stamperia della Stella. 1664.
- Trattato della direzione de' fiumi (in Italian). Bologna: Giulio Borzaghi. 1700.

== Bibliography ==
- Tabarroni, Giorgio (1974). "Michelini, Famiano". Dictionary of Scientific Biography. Vol. 9. Charles Scribner's Sons. pp. 369–370.
- Favino, Federica (2010) [1960]. "Famiano Michelini". Dizionario Biografico degli Italiani, Volume 74: Messi–Miraglia (in Italian). Rome: Istituto dell'Enciclopedia Italiana. ISBN 978-8-81200032-6.
