= Smart Weapon End-to-End Performance Model =

Hastagrakesh

The Smart Weapon End-to-End Performance Model (SWEEPM) is a modeling software developed by the United States Army Research Laboratory (ARL), designed to measure the overall effectiveness of all types of munitions. SWEEPM was conceived in 2008 and completed in April 2013.

The model provides simulated performance data on conceptual or existing guided artillery rounds. Ballistic engineers analyze information gathered on the effectiveness of a round in battle, such as impact against a tank or truck.

SWEEPM software can measure other variables such as material composition of the round, muzzle velocity, how soldiers aim and fire weapon systems, weather, and stationary or moving targets. This information assists researchers in studying scenarios that indicate the amount of damage the round causes.

Researchers rely on high-performance computers housed within the ARL Supercomputing Research Center managed by ARL's Computational and Information Sciences Directorate at Aberdeen Proving Ground, Maryland. SWEEPM's high-fidelity physics sub-modules can only be run on these supercomputers.

Mary K. Arthur, a mathematician in the Lethality Division of ARL, is the principal investigator credited with developing SWEEPM after recognizing a void in modeling and analyzing smart weapon systems from target acquisition through damage estimation.
