= Karl Stumpff =

German astronomer

Karl Johann Nikolaus Stumpff (May 17, 1895 – November 10, 1970) was a German astronomer. The Stumpff functions, used in the universal variable formulation of the two-body problem, are named after him.

== Works ==
- Analyse periodischer Vorgänge. Gebrüder Borntraeger: Berlin 1927
- Grundlagen und Methoden der Periodenforschung. Berlin 1937
- Ermittlung und Realität von Periodizitäten. Korrelationsrechnung. In: Handbuch der Geophysik. 1940
- Tafeln und Aufgaben zur Harmonischen Analyse und Periodogrammrechnung. Berlin 1939
- Neue Theorie und Methoden der Ephemeridenrechnung. Abhandlungen der Deutschen Akademie der Wissenschaften 1947
- Neue Wege zur Bahnberechnung der Himmelskörper. In: Fortschritte der Physik. vol.1, 1954, pp. 557–596
- Geographische Ortsbestimmungen. In: Hochschulbücher für Physik. Berlin 1955
- Himmelsmechanik. 3 vols., Deutscher Verlag der Wissenschaften, Berlin 1959, 1965, 1974
- Die Erde als Planet. 1939, 1955
- Das Uhrwerk des Himmels. Stuttgart 1942, 1944
- Neuauflage und Bearbeiter von Littrow Wunder des Himmels. Bonn 1963
- Fischer Lexikon Astronomie. 1957, 1972
- Astronomie gegen Astrologie. 1955
