= Modeling and simulation =

Use of models as a basis for simulations

Modeling and simulation (M&S) is the use of models (e.g., physical, mathematical, behavioral, or logical representation of a system, entity, phenomenon, or process) as a basis for simulations to develop data utilized for managerial or technical decision making.

In the computer application of modeling and simulation a computer is used to build a mathematical model which contains key parameters of the physical model. The mathematical model represents the physical model in virtual form, and conditions are applied that set up the experiment of interest. The simulation starts – i.e., the computer calculates the results of those conditions on the mathematical model – and outputs results in a format that is either machine- or human-readable, depending upon the implementation.

The use of M&S within engineering is well recognized. Simulation technology belongs to the tool set of engineers of all application domains and has been included in the body of knowledge of engineering management. M&S helps to reduce costs, increase the quality of products and systems, and document and archive lessons learned. Because the results of a simulation are only as good as the underlying model(s), engineers, operators, and analysts must pay particular attention to its construction. To ensure that the results of the simulation are applicable to the real world, the user must understand the assumptions, conceptualizations, and constraints of its implementation. Additionally, models may be updated and improved using results of actual experiments. M&S is a discipline on its own. Its many application domains often lead to the assumption that M&S is a pure application. This is not the case and needs to be recognized by engineering management in the application of M&S.

The use of such mathematical models and simulations avoids actual experimentation, which can be costly and time-consuming. Instead, mathematical knowledge and computational power is used to solve real-world problems cheaply and in a time efficient manner. As such, M&S can facilitate understanding a system's behavior without actually testing the system in the real world. For example, to determine which type of spoiler would improve traction the most while designing a race car, a computer simulation of the car could be used to estimate the effect of different spoiler shapes on the coefficient of friction in a turn. Useful insights about different decisions in the design could be gleaned without actually building the car. In addition, simulation can support experimentation that occurs totally in software, or in human-in-the-loop environments where simulation represents systems or generates data needed to meet experiment objectives. Furthermore, simulation can be used to train persons using a virtual environment that would otherwise be difficult or expensive to produce.

== Interest in simulations ==
Technically, simulation is well accepted. The 2006 National Science Foundation (NSF) Report on "Simulation-based Engineering Science" showed the potential of using simulation technology and methods to revolutionize the engineering science. Among the reasons for the steadily increasing interest in simulation applications are the following:

1. Using simulations is generally cheaper, safer and sometimes more ethical than conducting real-world experiments. For example, supercomputers are sometimes used to simulate the detonation of nuclear devices and their effects in order to support better preparedness in the event of a nuclear explosion. Similar efforts are conducted to simulate hurricanes and other natural catastrophes.
2. Simulations can often be even more realistic than traditional experiments, as they allow the free configuration of the realistic range of environment parameters found in the operational application field of the final product. Examples are supporting deep water operation of the US Navy or the simulating the surface of neighbored planets in preparation of NASA missions.
3. Simulations can often be conducted faster than real time. This allows using them for efficient if-then-else analyses of different alternatives, in particular when the necessary data to initialize the simulation can easily be obtained from operational data. This use of simulation adds decision support simulation systems to the tool box of traditional decision support systems.
4. Simulations allow setting up a coherent synthetic environment that allows for integration of simulated systems in the early analysis phase via mixed virtual systems with first prototypical components to a virtual test environment for the final system. If managed correctly, the environment can be migrated from the development and test domain to the training and education domain in follow-on life cycle phases for the systems (including the option to train and optimize a virtual twin of the real system under realistic constraints even before first components are being built).

The military and defense domain, in particular within the United States, has been the main M&S champion, in form of funding as well as application of M&S. E.g., M&S in modern military organizations is part of the acquisition/procurement strategy. Specifically, M&S is used to conduct Events and Experiments that influence requirements and training for military systems. As such, M&S is considered an integral part of systems engineering of military systems. Other application domains, however, are currently catching up. M&S in the fields of medicine, transportation, and other industries is poised to rapidly outstrip DoD's use of M&S in the years ahead, if it hasn't already happened.

== Simulation in science ==
Modeling and simulation are important in research. Representing the real systems either via physical reproductions at smaller scale, or via mathematical models that allow representing the dynamics of the system via simulation, allows exploring system behavior in an articulated way which is often either not possible, or too risky in the real world.

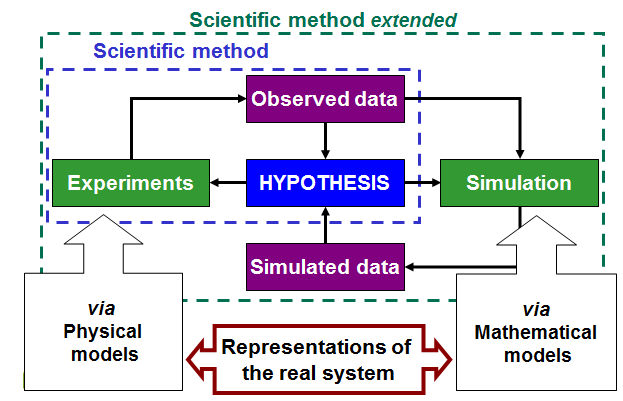
How modeling extends the scientific method at the base of research

== As an emerging discipline ==
"The emerging discipline of M&S is based on developments in diverse computer science areas as well as influenced by developments in systems theory, systems engineering, software engineering, artificial intelligence, and more. This foundation is as diverse as that of engineering management and brings elements of art, engineering, and science together in a complex and unique way that requires domain experts to enable appropriate decisions when it comes to application or development of M&S technology in the context of this paper. The diversity and application-oriented nature of this new discipline sometimes result in the challenge, that the supported application domains themselves already have vocabularies in place that are not necessarily aligned between disjunctive domains. A comprehensive and concise representation of concepts, terms, and activities is needed that make up a professional Body of Knowledge for the M&S discipline. Due to the broad variety of contributors, this process is still ongoing."

Padilla et al. recommend in "Do we Need M&S Science" to distinguish between M&S Science, Engineering, and Applications.

- M&S Science contributes to the Theory of M&S, defining the academic foundations of the discipline.
- M&S Engineering is rooted in Theory but looks for applicable solution patterns. The focus is general methods that can be applied in various problem domains.
- M&S Applications solve real world problems by focusing on solutions using M&S. Often, the solution results from applying a method, but many solutions are very problem domain specific and are derived from problem domain expertise and not from any general M&S theory or method.

Models can be composed of different units (models at finer granularity) linked to achieving a specific goal; for this reason they can be also called modeling solutions.

More generally, modeling and simulation is a key enabler for systems engineering activities as the system representation in a computer readable (and possibly executable) model enables engineers to reproduce the system (or Systems of System) behavior. A collection of applicative modeling and simulation method to support systems engineering activities in provided in.

The various aspects of the profession of modeling and simulation were compiled in a book.

== Application domains ==
There are many categorizations possible, but the following taxonomy has been very successfully used in the defense domain, and is currently applied to medical simulation and transportation simulation as well.

- Analyses Support is conducted in support of planning and experimentation. Very often, the search for an optimal solution that shall be implemented is driving these efforts. What-if analyses of alternatives fall into this category as well. This style of work is often accomplished by simulysts - those having skills in both simulation and as analysts. This blending of simulation and analyst is well noted in Kleijnen.
- Systems Engineering Support is applied for the procurement, development, and testing of systems. This support can start in early phases and include topics like executable system architectures, and it can support testing by providing a virtual environment in which tests are conducted. This style of work is often accomplished by engineers and architects.
- Training and Education Support provides simulators, virtual training environments, and serious games to train and educate people. This style of work is often accomplished by trainers working in concert with computer scientists.

A special use of Analyses Support is applied to ongoing business operations. Traditionally, decision support systems provide this functionality. Simulation systems improve their functionality by adding the dynamic element and allow to compute estimates and predictions, including optimization and what-if analyses.

== Individual concepts ==
Although the terms "modeling" and "simulation" are often used as synonyms within disciplines applying M&S exclusively as a tool, within the discipline of M&S both are treated as individual and equally important concepts. Modeling is understood as the purposeful abstraction of reality, resulting in the formal specification of a conceptualization and underlying assumptions and constraints. M&S is in particular interested in models that are used to support the implementation of an executable version on a computer. The execution of a model over time is understood as the simulation. While modeling targets the conceptualization, simulation challenges mainly focus on implementation, in other words, modeling resides on the abstraction level, whereas simulation resides on the implementation level.

Conceptualization and implementation – modeling and simulation – are two activities that are mutually dependent, but can nonetheless be conducted by separate individuals. Management and engineering knowledge and guidelines are needed to ensure that they are well connected. Like an engineering management professional in systems engineering needs to make sure that the systems design captured in a systems architecture is aligned with the systems development, this task needs to be conducted with the same level of professionalism for the model that has to be implemented as well. As the role of big data and analytics continues to grow, the role of combined simulation of analysis is the realm of yet another professional called a simplest – in order to blend algorithmic and analytic techniques through visualizations available directly to decision makers. A study designed for the Bureau of Labor and Statistics by Lee et al. provides an interesting look at how bootstrap techniques (statistical analysis) were used with simulation to generate population data where there existed none.

== Academic programs ==
Modeling and Simulation has only recently become an academic discipline of its own. Formerly, those working in the field usually had a background in engineering.

The following institutions offer degrees in Modeling and Simulation:

Ph D. Programs

- University of Pennsylvania (Philadelphia, PA)
- Old Dominion University (Norfolk, VA)
- University of Alabama in Huntsville (Huntsville, AL)
- University of Central Florida (Orlando, FL)
- Naval Postgraduate School (Monterey, CA)
- University of Genoa (Genoa, Italy)

Masters Programs

- National University of Science and Technology, Pakistan (Islamabad, Pakistan)
- Arizona State University (Tempe, AZ)
- Old Dominion University (Norfolk, VA)
- University of Central Florida (Orlando, FL)
- the University of Alabama in Huntsville (Huntsville, AL)
- Middle East Technical University (Ankara, Turkey)
- University of New South Wales (Australia)
- Naval Postgraduate School (Monterey, CA)
- Department of Scientific Computing, Modeling and Simulation (M.Tech (Modelling & Simulation)) (Savitribai Phule Pune University, India)
- Columbus State University (Columbus, GA)
- Purdue University Calumet (Hammond, IN)
- Delft University of Technology (Delft, The Netherlands)
- University of Genoa (Genoa, Italy)
- Hamburg University of Applied Sciences (Hamburg, Germany)

Professional Science Masters Programs

- University of Central Florida (Orlando, FL)

Graduate Certificate Programs

- Portland State University Systems Science
- Columbus State University (Columbus, GA)
- the University of Alabama in Huntsville (Huntsville, AL)

Undergraduate Programs

- Old Dominion University (Norfolk, VA)
- Ghulam Ishaq Khan Institute of Engineering Sciences and Technology (Swabi, Pakistan)

== Modeling and Simulation Body of Knowledge ==
The Modeling and Simulation Body of Knowledge (M&S BoK) is the domain of knowledge (information) and capability (competency) that identifies the modeling and simulation community of practice and the M&S profession, industry, and market.

The M&S BoK Index is a set of pointers providing handles so that subject information content can be denoted, identified, accessed, and manipulated.

The president of the Society for Modeling and Simulation International (SCS) commissioned three fellows of SCS - Tuncer Ören, Bernard P. Zeigler, and Andreas Tolk - to compile the M&S BoK into a book. The project was finished in 2022 and the book was published by Springer Nature in their series on Simulation Foundations, Methods, and Applications:

== Summary ==
Three activities have to be conducted and orchestrated to ensure success:

1. a model must be produced that captures formally the conceptualization,
2. a simulation must implement this model, and
3. management must ensure that model and simulation are interconnected and on the current state (which means that normally the model needs to be updated in case the simulation is changed as well).

== See also ==
- Computational science
- Computational engineering
- Defense Technical Information Center
- Glossary of military modeling and simulation
- Interservice/Industry Training, Simulation and Education Conference (I/ITSEC)
- Microscale and macroscale models
- Military Operations Research Society (MORS)
- Military simulation
- Modeling and Simulation Coordination Office
- Operations research
- Orbit modeling
- Power system simulation
- Rule-based modeling
- Simulation Interoperability Standards Organization (SISO)
