= Scene generator =

A scene generator is a computer model that creates a world representation using phenomenology, physics, and behavioral models, to achieve a useful rendition of the domain of interest. Usually found associated with the synthetic modeling of electro-magnetic spectral domains like Optical (Visible, IR, UV) or Radio Frequency. A hyperspectral scene generator is when multiple electro-magnetic spectra can be handled simultaneously.
