= Computer simulation =

Process of mathematical modelling, performed on a computer

A 48-hour computer simulation of Typhoon Mawar using the Weather Research and Forecasting model

Process of building a computer model, and the interplay between experiment, simulation, and theory

Computer simulation is the running of a mathematical model on a computer, the model being designed to represent the behaviour of, or the outcome of, a real-world or physical system. The reliability of some mathematical models can be determined by comparing their results to the real-world outcomes they aim to predict. Computer simulations have become a useful tool for the mathematical modeling of many natural systems in physics (computational physics), astrophysics, climatology, chemistry, biology and manufacturing, as well as human systems in economics, psychology, social science, health care and engineering. Simulation of a system is represented as the running of the system's model. It can be used to explore and gain new insights into new technology and to estimate the performance of systems too complex for analytical solutions.

Computer simulations are realized by running computer programs that can be either small, running almost instantly on small devices, or large-scale programs that run for hours or days on network-based groups of computers. The scale of events being simulated by computer simulations has far exceeded anything possible (or perhaps even imaginable) using traditional paper-and-pencil mathematical modeling. In 1997, a desert-battle simulation of one force invading another involved the modeling of 66,239 tanks, trucks and other vehicles on simulated terrain around Kuwait, using multiple supercomputers in the DoD High Performance Computer Modernization Program. Other examples include a 1-billion-atom model of material deformation; a 2.64-million-atom model of the complex protein-producing organelle of all living organisms, the ribosome, in 2005; a complete simulation of the life cycle of Mycoplasma genitalium in 2012; and the Blue Brain project at EPFL (Switzerland), begun in May 2005 to create the first computer simulation of the entire human brain, right down to the molecular level.

Because of the computational cost of simulation, computer experiments are used to perform inference such as uncertainty quantification.

== Simulation versus model ==
A model consists of the equations used to capture the behavior of a system. By contrast, computer simulation is the actual running of the program that perform algorithms which solve those equations, often in an approximate manner. Simulation, therefore, is the process of running a model. Thus one would not "build a simulation"; instead, one would "build a model (or a simulator)", and then either "run the model" or equivalently "run a simulation".

== History ==
Computer simulation developed hand-in-hand with the rapid growth of the computer, following its first large-scale deployment during the Manhattan Project in World War II to model the process of nuclear detonation. It was a simulation of 12 hard spheres using a Monte Carlo algorithm. Computer simulation is often used as an adjunct to, or substitute for, modeling systems for which simple closed form analytic solutions are not possible. There are many types of computer simulations; their common feature is the attempt to generate a sample of representative scenarios for a model in which a complete enumeration of all possible states of the model would be prohibitive or impossible.

== Data preparation ==
The external data requirements of simulations and models vary widely. For some, the input might be just a few numbers (for example, simulation of a waveform of AC electricity on a wire), while others might require terabytes of information (such as weather and climate models).

Input sources also vary widely:

- Sensors and other physical devices connected to the model;
- Control surfaces used to direct the progress of the simulation in some way;
- Current or historical data entered by hand;
- Values extracted as a by-product from other processes;
- Values output for the purpose by other simulations, models, or processes.

Lastly, the time at which data is available varies:

- "invariant" data is often built into the model code, either because the value is truly invariant (e.g., the value of π) or because the designers consider the value to be invariant for all cases of interest;
- data can be entered into the simulation when it starts up, for example by reading one or more files, or by reading data from a preprocessor;
- data can be provided during the simulation run, for example by a sensor network.

Because of this variety, and because diverse simulation systems have many common elements, there are a large number of specialized simulation languages. The best-known may be Simula. There are now many others.

Systems that accept data from external sources must be very careful in knowing what they are receiving. While it is easy for computers to read in values from text or binary files, what is much harder is knowing what the accuracy (compared to measurement resolution and precision) of the values are. Often they are expressed as "error bars", a minimum and maximum deviation from the value range within which the true value (is expected to) lie. Because digital computer mathematics is not perfect, rounding and truncation errors multiply this error, so it is useful to perform an "error analysis" to confirm that values output by the simulation will still be usefully accurate.

== Types ==
Models used for computer simulations can be classified according to several independent pairs of attributes, including:

- Stochastic or deterministic (and as a special case of deterministic, chaotic) – see external links below for examples of stochastic vs. deterministic simulations
- Steady-state or dynamic
- Continuous or discrete (and as an important special case of discrete, discrete event or DE models)
- Dynamic system simulation, e.g. electric systems, hydraulic systems or multi-body mechanical systems (described primarily by DAE:s) or dynamics simulation of field problems, e.g. CFD of FEM simulations (described by PDE:s).
- Local or distributed.

Another way of categorizing models is to look at the underlying data structures. For time-stepped simulations, there are two main classes:

- Simulations which store their data in regular grids and require only next-neighbor access are called stencil codes. Many CFD applications belong to this category.
- If the underlying graph is not a regular grid, the model may belong to the meshfree method class.

For steady-state simulations, equations define the relationships between elements of the modeled system and attempt to find a state in which the system is in equilibrium. Such models are often used in simulating physical systems, as a simpler modeling case before dynamic simulation is attempted.

- Dynamic simulations attempt to capture changes in a system in response to (usually changing) input signals.
- Stochastic models use random number generators to model chance or random events;
- A discrete event simulation (DES) manages events in time. Most computer, logic-test and fault-tree simulations are of this type. In this type of simulation, the simulator maintains a queue of events sorted by the simulated time they should occur. The simulator reads the queue and triggers new events as each event is processed. It is not important to execute the simulation in real time. It is often more important to be able to access the data produced by the simulation and to discover logic defects in the design or the sequence of events.
- A continuous dynamic simulation performs numerical solution of differential-algebraic equations or differential equations (either partial or ordinary). Periodically, the simulation program solves all the equations and uses the numbers to change the state and output of the simulation. Applications include flight simulators, construction and management simulation games, chemical process modeling, and simulations of electrical circuits. Originally, these kinds of simulations were actually implemented on analog computers, where the differential equations could be represented directly by various electrical components such as op-amps. By the late 1980s, however, most "analog" simulations were run on conventional digital computers that emulate the behavior of an analog computer.
- A special type of discrete simulation that does not rely on a model with an underlying equation, but can nonetheless be represented formally, is agent-based simulation. In agent-based simulation, the individual entities (such as molecules, cells, trees or consumers) in the model are represented directly (rather than by their density or concentration) and possess an internal state and set of behaviors or rules that determine how the agent's state is updated from one time-step to the next.
- Distributed models run on a network of interconnected computers, possibly through the Internet. Simulations dispersed across multiple host computers like this are often referred to as "distributed simulations". There are several standards for distributed simulation, including Aggregate Level Simulation Protocol (ALSP), Distributed Interactive Simulation (DIS), the High Level Architecture (simulation) (HLA) and the Test and Training Enabling Architecture (TENA).

== Visualization ==
Formerly, the output data from a computer simulation was sometimes presented in a table or a matrix showing how data were affected by numerous changes in the simulation parameters. The use of the matrix format was related to traditional use of the matrix concept in mathematical models. However, psychologists and others noted that humans could quickly perceive trends by looking at graphs or even moving-images or motion-pictures generated from the data, as displayed by computer-generated-imagery (CGI) animation. Although observers could not necessarily read out numbers or quote math formulas, from observing a moving weather chart they might be able to predict events (and "see that rain was headed their way") much faster than by scanning tables of rain-cloud coordinates. Such intense graphical displays, which transcended the world of numbers and formulae, sometimes also led to output that lacked a coordinate grid or omitted timestamps, as if straying too far from numeric data displays. Today, weather forecasting models tend to balance the view of moving rain/snow clouds against a map that uses numeric coordinates and numeric timestamps of events.

Similarly, CGI computer simulations of CAT scans can simulate how a tumor might shrink or change during an extended period of medical treatment, presenting the passage of time as a spinning view of the visible human head, as the tumor changes.

Other applications of CGI computer simulations are being developed to graphically display large amounts of data, in motion, as changes occur during a simulation run.

== In science ==
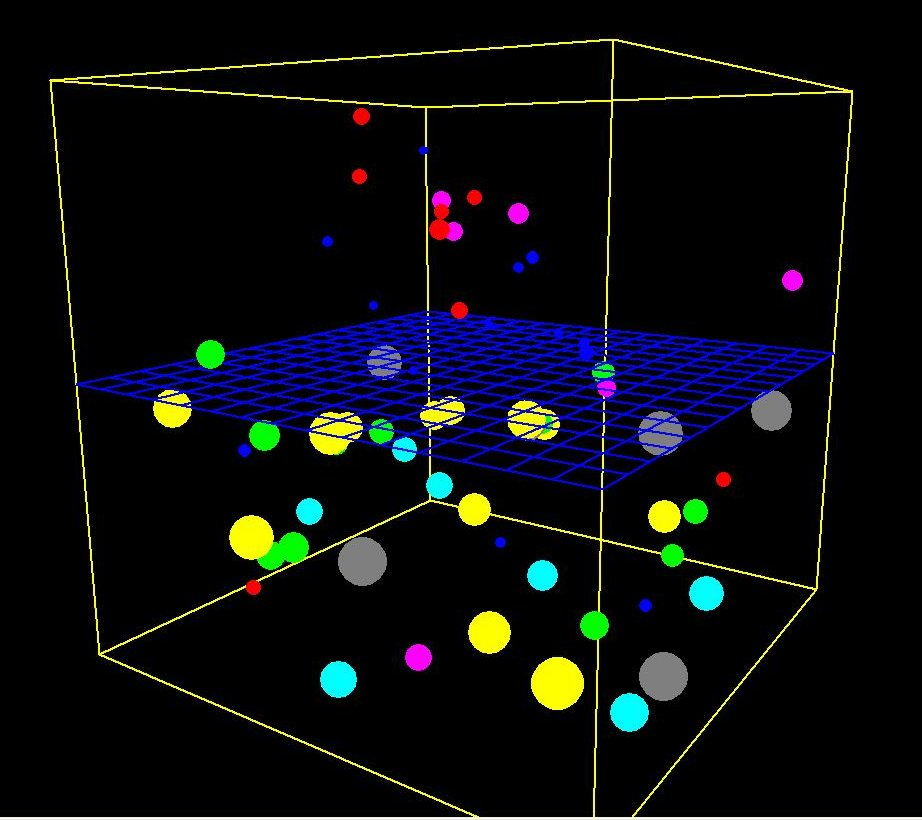
Computer simulation of the process of osmosis

Generic examples of types of computer simulations in science, which are derived from an underlying mathematical description:

- a numerical simulation of differential equations that cannot be solved analytically, theories that involve continuous systems such as phenomena in physical cosmology, fluid dynamics (e.g., climate models, roadway noise models, roadway air dispersion models), continuum mechanics and chemical kinetics fall into this category.
- a stochastic simulation, typically used for discrete systems where events occur probabilistically and which cannot be described directly with differential equations (this is a discrete simulation in the above sense). Phenomena in this category include genetic drift, biochemical or gene regulatory networks with small numbers of molecules. (see also: Monte Carlo method).
- multiparticle simulation of the response of nanomaterials at multiple scales to an applied force for the purpose of modeling their thermoelastic and thermodynamic properties. Techniques used for such simulations are Molecular dynamics, Molecular mechanics, Monte Carlo method, and Multiscale Green's function.

Specific examples of computer simulations include:

- statistical simulations based upon an agglomeration of a large number of input profiles, such as the forecasting of equilibrium temperature of receiving waters, allowing the gamut of meteorological data to be input for a specific locale. This technique was developed for thermal pollution forecasting.
- agent based simulation has been used effectively in ecology, where it is often called "individual based modeling" and is used in situations for which individual variability in the agents cannot be neglected, such as population dynamics of salmon and trout (most purely mathematical models assume all trout behave identically).
- time stepped dynamic model. In hydrology there are several such hydrology transport models such as the SWMM and DSSAM Models developed by the U.S. Environmental Protection Agency for river water quality forecasting.
- computer simulations have also been used to formally model theories of human cognition and performance, e.g., ACT-R.
- computer simulation using molecular modeling for drug discovery.
- computer simulation to model viral infection in mammalian cells.
- computer simulation for studying the selective sensitivity of bonds by mechanochemistry during grinding of organic molecules.
- Computational fluid dynamics simulations are used to simulate the behaviour of flowing air, water and other fluids. One-, two- and three-dimensional models are used. A one-dimensional model might simulate the effects of water hammer in a pipe. A two-dimensional model might be used to simulate the drag forces on the cross-section of an aeroplane wing. A three-dimensional simulation might estimate the heating and cooling requirements of a large building.
- An understanding of statistical thermodynamic molecular theory is fundamental to the appreciation of molecular solutions. Development of the Potential Distribution Theorem (PDT) allows this complex subject to be simplified to down-to-earth presentations of molecular theory.

Notable, and sometimes controversial, computer simulations used in science include: Donella Meadows' World3 used in the Limits to Growth, James Lovelock's Daisyworld and Thomas Ray's Tierra.

In social sciences, computer simulation is an integral component of the five angles of analysis fostered by the data percolation methodology, which also includes qualitative and quantitative methods, reviews of the literature (including scholarly), and interviews with experts, and which forms an extension of data triangulation. Of course, similar to any other scientific method, replication is an important part of computational modeling

== In practical contexts ==
Computer simulations are used in a wide variety of practical contexts, such as:

- analysis of air pollutant dispersion using atmospheric dispersion modeling
- As a possible humane alternative to live animal testing in respect to animal rights.
- design of complex systems such as aircraft and also logistics systems.
- design of noise barriers to effect roadway noise mitigation
- modeling of application performance
- flight simulators to train pilots
- weather forecasting
- Numerical modeling (geology)
- forecasting of risk
- simulation of electrical circuits
- Power system simulation
- simulation of other computers is emulation.
- forecasting of prices on financial markets (for example Adaptive Modeler)
- behavior of structures (such as buildings and industrial parts) under stress and other conditions
- design of industrial processes, such as chemical processing plants
- strategic management and organizational studies
- reservoir simulation for the petroleum engineering to model the subsurface reservoir
- process engineering simulation tools.
- robot simulators for the design of robots and robot control algorithms
- urban simulation models that simulate dynamic patterns of urban development and responses to urban land use and transportation policies.
- traffic engineering to plan or redesign parts of the street network from single junctions over cities to a national highway network to transportation system planning, design and operations. See a more detailed article on Simulation in Transportation.
- modeling car crashes to test safety mechanisms in new vehicle models.
- crop-soil systems in agriculture, via dedicated software frameworks (e.g. BioMA, OMS3, APSIM)

The reliability and the trust people put in computer simulations depends on the validity of the simulation model, therefore verification and validation are of crucial importance in the development of computer simulations. Another important aspect of computer simulations is that of reproducibility of the results, meaning that a simulation model should not provide a different answer for each execution. Although this might seem obvious, this is a special point of attention in stochastic simulations, where random numbers should actually be semi-random numbers. An exception to reproducibility are human-in-the-loop simulations such as flight simulations and computer games. Here a human is part of the simulation and thus influences the outcome in a way that is hard, if not impossible, to reproduce exactly.

Vehicle manufacturers make use of computer simulation to test safety features in new designs. By building a copy of the car in a physics simulation environment, they can save the hundreds of thousands of dollars that would otherwise be required to build and test a unique prototype. Engineers can step through the simulation milliseconds at a time to determine the exact stresses being put upon each section of the prototype.

Computer graphics can be used to display the results of a computer simulation. Animations can be used to experience a simulation in real-time, e.g., in training simulations. In some cases animations may also be useful in faster than real-time or even slower than real-time modes. For example, faster than real-time animations can be useful in visualizing the buildup of queues in the simulation of humans evacuating a building. Furthermore, simulation results are often aggregated into static images using various ways of scientific visualization.

In debugging, simulating a program execution under test (rather than executing natively) can detect far more errors than the hardware itself can detect and, at the same time, log useful debugging information such as instruction trace, memory alterations and instruction counts. This technique can also detect buffer overflow and similar "hard to detect" errors as well as produce performance information and tuning data.

== Pitfalls ==
Although sometimes ignored in computer simulations, it is very important to perform a sensitivity analysis to ensure that the accuracy of the results is properly understood. For example, the probabilistic risk analysis of factors determining the success of an oilfield exploration program involves combining samples from a variety of statistical distributions using the Monte Carlo method. If, for instance, one of the key parameters (e.g., the net ratio of oil-bearing strata) is known to only one significant figure, then the result of the simulation might not be more precise than one significant figure, although it might (misleadingly) be presented as having four significant figures.

== See also ==
- Computational model
- Digital twin
- Illustris project
- In silico
- List of computer simulation software
- Scene generator
- Simulation
- Simulation hypothesis
- Simulation software
- Simulation video game
- UniverseMachine
- Virtual prototyping
- Virtual reality
- Web-based simulation
