= Apsis =

Either of two extreme points in a celestial object's orbit

The two apsides, apoapsis and periapsis, are the farthest (2) and nearest (3) points reached by an orbiting planetary body (2 and 3) with respect to the primary, or host, body (1)

An apsis (from Ancient Greek ἁψίς (hapsís) 'arch, vault' (third declension); pl. apsides /ˈæpsɪˌdiːz/ AP-sih-deez) is one of the two extreme points in the orbit of a planetary body about its primary body, either the farthest point (apoapsis) or the nearest point (periapsis). The line of apsides (also called apse line, or major axis of the orbit) is the line connecting the two apsides.

Apsides pertaining to orbits around different bodies have distinct names to differentiate themselves from other apsides. Apsides pertaining to geocentric orbits, orbits around the Earth, are at the farthest point called the apogee, and at the nearest point the perigee, as with orbits of satellites and the Moon around Earth. Apsides pertaining to orbits around the Sun are named aphelion for the farthest and perihelion for the nearest point in a heliocentric orbit. Earth's two apsides are the farthest point, aphelion, and the nearest point, perihelion, of its orbit around the host Sun. The terms aphelion and perihelion apply in the same way to the orbits of Jupiter and the other planets, the comets, and the asteroids of the Solar System.

== General description ==
The two-body system of interacting elliptic orbits: The smaller, satellite body (blue) orbits the primary body (yellow); both are in elliptic orbits around their common center of mass (or barycenter), (red +). ∗Periapsis and apoapsis as distances: the smallest and largest distances between the orbiter and its host body.

There are two apsides in any elliptic orbit. The name for each apsis is created from the prefixes ap-, apo- (from ἀπ(ό), (ap(o)-) 'away from') for the farthest or peri- (from περί (peri-) 'near') for the closest point to the primary body, with a suffix that describes the primary body. The suffix for Earth is -gee, so the apsides' names are apogee and perigee. For the Sun, the suffix is -helion, so the names are aphelion and perihelion.

According to Newton's laws of motion, all periodic orbits are ellipses. The barycenter of the two bodies may lie well within the bigger body—e.g., the Earth–Moon barycenter is about 75% of the way from Earth's center to its surface. If, compared to the larger mass, the smaller mass is negligible (e.g., for satellites), then the orbital parameters are independent of the smaller mass.

When used as a suffix—that is, -apsis—the term can refer to the two distances from the primary body to the orbiting body when the latter is located: 1) at the periapsis point, or 2) at the apoapsis point (compare both graphics, second figure). The line of apsides denotes the distance of the line that joins the nearest and farthest points across an orbit; it also refers simply to the extreme range of an object orbiting a host body (see top figure; see third figure).

In orbital mechanics, the apsides technically refer to the distance measured between the barycenter of the 2-body system and the center of mass of the orbiting body. However, in the case of a spacecraft, the terms are commonly used to refer to the orbital altitude of the spacecraft above the surface of the central body (assuming a constant, standard reference radius).

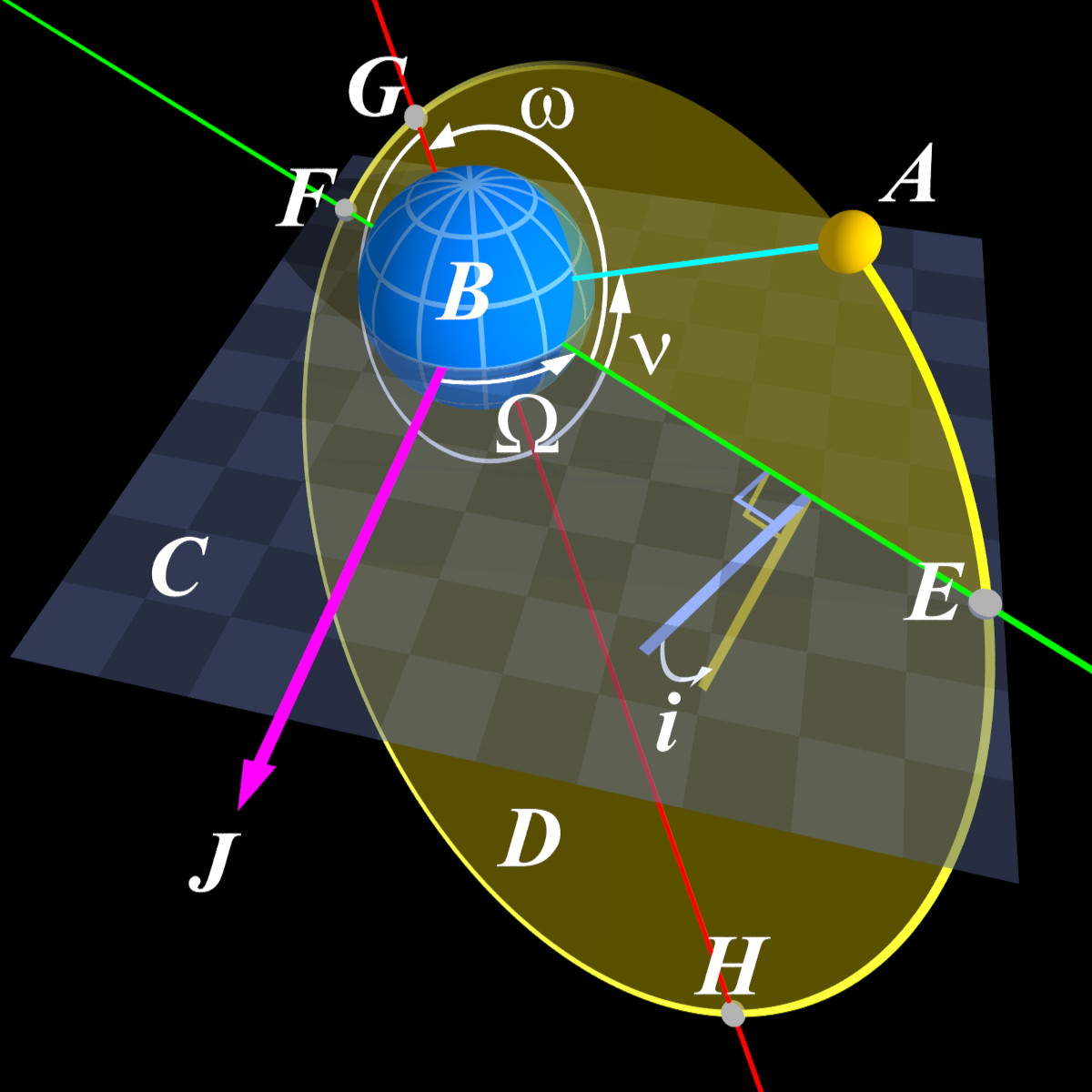
Keplerian orbital elements: point G, the nearest point of approach of an orbiting body, is the pericenter (also periapsis) of an orbit; point H, the farthest point of the orbiting body, is the apocenter (also apoapsis) of the orbit; and the red line between them is the line of apsides.

== Terminology ==
The words "pericenter" and "apocenter" are often seen, although periapsis and apoapsis are preferred in technical usage.

- For generic situations where the primary is not specified, the terms pericenter and apocenter are used for naming the extreme points of orbits (see table, top figure); periapsis and apoapsis (or apapsis) are equivalent alternatives, but these terms also frequently refer to distances—that is, the smallest and largest distances between the orbiter and its host body (see second figure).
- For a body orbiting the Sun, the point of least distance is the perihelion (/ˌpɛrɪˈhiːliən/), and the point of greatest distance is the aphelion (/æpˈhiːliən/); when discussing orbits around other stars the terms become periastron and apastron.
- When discussing a satellite of Earth, including the Moon, the point of least distance is the perigee (/ˈpɛrɪdʒiː/), and of greatest distance, the apogee (from Ancient Greek: Γῆ (Gē), "land" or "earth").
- For objects in lunar orbit, the point of least distance is called the pericynthion (/ˌpɛrɪˈsɪnθiən/) and the greatest distance the apocynthion (/ˌæpəˈsɪnθiən/). The terms perilune and apolune, as well as periselene and aposelene are also used. Since the Moon has no natural satellites this only applies to man-made objects.

=== Etymology ===
The words perihelion and aphelion were coined by Johannes Kepler to describe the orbital motions of the planets around the Sun. The words are formed from the prefixes peri- (Greek: περί, near) and apo- (Greek: ἀπό, away from), affixed to the Greek word for the Sun, (ἥλιος, or hēlíos).

Various related terms are used for other celestial objects. The suffixes -gee, -helion, -astron and -galacticon are frequently used in the astronomical literature when referring to the Earth, Sun, stars, and the Galactic Center respectively. The suffix -jove is occasionally used for Jupiter, but -saturnium has very rarely been used in the last 50 years for Saturn. The -gee form is also used as a generic closest-approach-to "any planet" term—instead of applying it only to Earth.

During the Apollo program, the terms pericynthion and apocynthion were used when referring to orbiting the Moon; they reference Cynthia, an alternative name for the Greek Moon goddess Artemis. More recently, during the Artemis program, the terms perilune and apolune have been used.

Regarding black holes, the term peribothron was first used in a 1976 paper by J. Frank and M. J. Rees, who credit W. R. Stoeger for suggesting creating a term using the greek word for pit: "bothron". The terms perimelasma and apomelasma (from a Greek root) were used by physicist and science-fiction author Geoffrey A. Landis in a story published in 1998, thus appearing before perinigricon and aponigricon (from Latin) in the scientific literature in 2002.

=== Terminology summary ===
The suffixes shown below may be added to prefixes peri- or apo- to form unique names of apsides for the orbiting bodies of the indicated host/(primary) system. However, only for the Earth, Moon and Sun systems are the unique suffixes commonly used. Exoplanet studies commonly use -astron, but typically, for other host systems the generic suffix, -apsis, is used instead.

Host objects in the Solar System with named/nameable apsides
Astronomical host object	Suffix	Origin of the name
Sun	-helion	Helios
Mercury	-hermion	Hermes
Venus	-cythe -cytherion	Cytherean
Earth	-gee	Gaia
Moon	-lune -cynthion -selene	Luna; Cynthia; Selene
Mars	-areion	Ares
Ceres	-demeter	Demeter
Jupiter	-jove	Zeus; Jupiter
Saturn	-chron -kronos -saturnium -krone	Cronos; Saturn
Uranus	-uranion	Uranus
Neptune	-poseideum -poseidion	Poseidon

Other host objects with named/nameable apsides
Astronomical host object	Suffix	Origin of the name
Star	-astron	Lat: astra; stars
Galaxy	-galacticon	Gr: galaxias; galaxy
Barycenter	-center -focus -apsis	
Black hole	-melasma -bothron -nigricon	Gr: melos; black Gr: bothros; hole Lat: niger; black

== Perihelion and aphelion ==
Diagram of a body's direct orbit around the Sun with its nearest (perihelion) and farthest (aphelion) points

The perihelion (q) and aphelion (Q) are the nearest and farthest points, respectively, of a body's direct orbit around the Sun.

Comparing osculating elements at a specific epoch to those at a different epoch will generate differences. The time-of-perihelion-passage as one of six osculating elements is not an exact prediction (other than for a generic two-body model) of the actual minimum distance to the Sun using the full dynamical model. Precise predictions of perihelion passage require numerical integration.

=== Inner planets and outer planets ===
The two images below show the orbits, orbital nodes, and positions of perihelion (q) and aphelion (Q) for the planets of the Solar System as seen from above the northern pole of Earth's ecliptic plane, which is coplanar with Earth's orbital plane. The planets travel counterclockwise around the Sun and for each planet, the blue part of their orbit travels north of the ecliptic plane, the pink part travels south, and dots mark perihelion (green) and aphelion (orange).

The first image (below-left) features the inner planets, situated outward from the Sun as Mercury, Venus, Earth, and Mars. The reference Earth-orbit is colored yellow and represents the orbital plane of reference. At the time of vernal equinox, the Earth is at the bottom of the figure. The second image (below-right) shows the outer planets, being Jupiter, Saturn, Uranus, and Neptune.

The orbital nodes are the two end points of the "line of nodes" where a planet's tilted orbit intersects the plane of reference; here they may be 'seen' as the points where the blue section of an orbit meets the pink.

The perihelion (green) and aphelion (orange) points of the inner planets of the Solar System

The perihelion (green) and aphelion (orange) points of the outer planets of the Solar System

=== Lines of apsides ===
The chart shows the extreme range—from the closest approach (perihelion) to farthest point (aphelion)—of several orbiting celestial bodies of the Solar System: the planets, the known dwarf planets, including Ceres, and Halley's Comet. The length of the horizontal bars correspond to the extreme range of the orbit of the indicated body around the Sun. These extreme distances (between perihelion and aphelion) are the lines of apsides of the orbits of various objects around a host body.

Distances of selected bodies of the Solar System from the Sun. The left and right edges of each bar correspond to the perihelion and aphelion of the body, respectively, hence long bars denote high orbital eccentricity. The radius of the Sun is 0.7 million km, and the radius of Jupiter (the largest planet) is 0.07 million km, both too small to resolve on this image.

=== Earth perihelion and aphelion ===
In the 21st century, the Earth reaches perihelion in early January, approximately 14 days after the December solstice. At perihelion, the Earth's center is about 0.9833 AU (147,100,000 km; 91,400,000 mi) from the Sun's center. In contrast, the Earth reaches aphelion currently in early July, approximately 14 days after the June solstice. The aphelion distance between the Earth's and Sun's centers is currently about 1.01664 AU (152,087,000 km; 94,503,000 mi).

The dates of perihelion and aphelion change over a century due to precession and other orbital factors, which follow cyclical patterns known as Milankovitch cycles. In the short-term, such dates can vary up to 3 days from one year to another as with aphelion on 3 July 2025 and 6 July 2026. This short-term variation is due to the presence of the Moon: while the Earth–Moon barycenter is moving on a stable orbit around the Sun, the position of the Earth's center which is on average about 4,700 kilometres (2,900 mi) from the barycenter, could be shifted in any direction from it—and this affects the timing of the actual closest approach between the Sun's and the Earth's centers (which in turn defines the timing of perihelion in a given year). On a longer time scale, the last July 3 aphelion is in 2060, and the last January 2 perihelion is in 2089 (2097 in the United States). The first July 7 aphelion is in 2067.

Because of the increased distance at aphelion, only 93.55% of the radiation from the Sun falls on a given area of Earth's surface as does at perihelion, but this does not account for the seasons, which result instead from the tilt of Earth's axis of 23.4° away from perpendicular to the plane of Earth's orbit. Indeed, at both perihelion and aphelion it is summer in one hemisphere while it is winter in the other one. Winter falls on the hemisphere where sunlight strikes least directly, and summer falls where sunlight strikes most directly, regardless of the Earth's distance from the Sun.

In the northern hemisphere, summer occurs at the same time as aphelion, when solar radiation is lowest. Despite this, summers in the northern hemisphere are on average 2.3 °C (4 °F) warmer than in the southern hemisphere, because the northern hemisphere contains larger land masses, which are easier to heat than the seas.

Perihelion and aphelion do however have an indirect effect on the seasons: because Earth's orbital speed is minimum at aphelion and maximum at perihelion, the planet takes longer to orbit from June solstice to September equinox than it does from December solstice to March equinox. Therefore, summer in the northern hemisphere lasts slightly longer (93 days) than summer in the southern hemisphere (89 days).

Astronomers commonly express the timing of perihelion relative to the First Point of Aries not in terms of days and hours, but rather as an angle of orbital displacement, the so-called longitude of the periapsis (also called longitude of the pericenter). For the orbit of the Earth, this is called the longitude of perihelion, and in 2000 it was about 282.895°; by 2010, this had advanced by a small fraction of a degree to about 283.067°, i.e. a mean increase of 62" per year.

For the orbit of the Earth around the Sun, the time of apsis is often expressed in terms of a time relative to seasons, since this determines the contribution of the elliptical orbit to seasonal variations. The variation of the seasons is primarily controlled by the annual cycle of the elevation angle of the Sun, which is a result of the tilt of the axis of the Earth measured from the plane of the ecliptic. The Earth's eccentricity and other orbital elements are not constant, but vary slowly due to the perturbing effects of the planets and other objects in the solar system (Milankovitch cycles).

On a very long time scale, the dates of perihelion and of aphelion progress through the seasons, and they make one complete cycle in 22,000 to 26,000 years. By the year 3800, perihelion will regularly occur in February. There is a corresponding movement of the position of the stars as seen from Earth, called the apsidal precession. (This is closely related to the precession of the axes.) The dates and times of perihelion and aphelion for several past and future years are listed in the following table:

Year	Perihelion		Aphelion	
Year	Date	Time (UT)	Date	Time (UT)
2010	January 3	00:09	July 6	11:30
2011	January 3	18:32	July 4	14:54
2012	January 5	00:32	July 5	03:32
2013	January 2	04:38	July 5	14:44
2014	January 4	11:59	July 4	00:13
2015	January 4	06:36	July 6	19:40
2016	January 2	22:49	July 4	16:24
2017	January 4	14:18	July 3	20:11
2018	January 3	05:35	July 6	16:47
2019	January 3	05:20	July 4	22:11
2020	January 5	07:48	July 4	11:35
2021	January 2	13:51	July 5	22:27
2022	January 4	06:55	July 4	07:11
2023	January 4	16:17	July 6	20:07
2024	January 3	00:39	July 5	05:06
2025	January 4	13:28	July 3	19:55
2026	January 3	17:16	July 6	17:31
2027	January 3	02:33	July 5	05:06
2028	January 5	12:28	July 3	22:18
2029	January 2	18:13	July 6	05:12
2030	January 3	10:12	July 4	12:58
2031	January 4	20:48	July 6	07:10
2032	January 3	05:11	July 5	11:54
2033	January 4	11:51	July 3	20:52
2034	January 4	04:47	July 6	18:49
2035	January 3	00:54	July 5	18:22
3800	February 2		August 4	

=== Other planets ===
The following table shows the distances of the planets and dwarf planets from the Sun at their perihelion and aphelion.

Type of body	Body	Distance from Sun at perihelion		Distance from Sun at aphelion		Difference (%) (Note: Difference is defined as $1-\frac{\text{perihelion distance}}{\text{aphelion distance}}$)	Insolation difference (%) (Note: Insolation difference is defined as $1-\left(\frac{\text{perihelion distance}}{\text{aphelion distance}}\right)^2$)
Type of body	Body	(km)	(miles)	(km)	(miles)	Difference (%)	Insolation difference (%)
Planet	Mercury	46,001,009 km	28,583,702 mi	69,817,445 km	43,382,549 mi	34.1%	56.6%
Planet	Venus	107,476,170 km	66,782,600 mi	108,942,780 km	67,693,910 mi	1.3%	2.7%
Planet	Earth	147,098,291 km	91,402,640 mi	152,098,233 km	94,509,460 mi	3.3%	6.5%
Planet	Mars	206,655,215 km	128,409,597 mi	249,232,432 km	154,865,853 mi	17.1%	31.2%
Planet	Jupiter	740,679,835 km	460,237,112 mi	816,001,807 km	507,040,016 mi	9.2%	17.6%
Planet	Saturn	1,349,823,615 km	838,741,509 mi	1,503,509,229 km	934,237,322 mi	10.2%	19.4%
Planet	Uranus	2,734,998,229 km	1.699449110×10^{9} mi	3,006,318,143 km	1.868039489×10^{9} mi	9.0%	17.2%
Planet	Neptune	4,459,753,056 km	2.771162073×10^{9} mi	4,537,039,826 km	2.819185846×10^{9} mi	1.7%	3.4%
Dwarf planet	Ceres	380,951,528 km	236,712,305 mi	446,428,973 km	277,398,103 mi	14.7%	27.2%
Dwarf planet	Pluto	4,436,756,954 km	2.756872958×10^{9} mi	7,376,124,302 km	4.583311152×10^{9} mi	39.8%	63.8%
Dwarf planet	Haumea	5,157,623,774 km	3.204798834×10^{9} mi	7,706,399,149 km	4.788534427×10^{9} mi	33.1%	55.2%
Dwarf planet	Makemake	5,671,928,586 km	3.524373028×10^{9} mi	7,894,762,625 km	4.905578065×10^{9} mi	28.2%	48.4%
Dwarf planet	Eris	5,765,732,799 km	3.582660263×10^{9} mi	14,594,512,904 km	9.068609883×10^{9} mi	60.5%	84.4%

== Mathematical formulae ==
These formulae characterize the pericenter and apocenter of an orbit:

Pericenter
Maximum speed, $v_\text{per} = \sqrt{ \frac{(1 + e)\mu}{(1 - e)a} } \,$, at minimum (pericenter) distance, $r_\text{per} = (1 - e)a$.
Apocenter
Minimum speed, $v_\text{ap} = \sqrt{\frac{(1 - e)\mu}{(1 + e)a} } \,$, at maximum (apocenter) distance, $r_\text{ap} = (1 + e)a$.

While, in accordance with Kepler's laws of planetary motion (based on the conservation of angular momentum) and the conservation of energy, these two quantities are constant for a given orbit:

Specific relative angular momentum
$$h = \sqrt{\left(1 - e^2\right)\mu a}$$
Specific orbital energy
$$\varepsilon = -\frac{\mu}{2a}$$

where:

- $r_\text{ap}$ is the distance from the apocenter to the primary focus
- $r_\text{per}$ is the distance from the pericenter to the primary focus
- a is the semi-major axis:
  $$a = \frac{r_\text{per} + r_\text{ap}}{2}$$
- μ is the standard gravitational parameter
- e is the eccentricity, defined as
  $$e = \frac{r_\text{ap} - r_\text{per}}{r_\text{ap} + r_\text{per}} = 1 - \frac{2}{\frac{r_\text{ap}}{r_\text{per}} + 1}$$

Note that for conversion from heights above the surface to distances between an orbit and its primary, the radius of the central body has to be added, and conversely.

The arithmetic mean of the two limiting distances is the length of the semi-major axis a. The geometric mean of the two distances is the length of the semi-minor axis b.

The geometric mean of the two limiting speeds is
$$\sqrt{-2\varepsilon} = \sqrt{\frac{\mu}{a}}$$
which is the speed of a body in a circular orbit whose radius is $a$.

== Time of perihelion ==
Orbital elements such as the time of perihelion passage are defined at the epoch chosen using an unperturbed two-body solution that does not account for the n-body problem. To get an accurate time of perihelion passage you need to use an epoch close to the perihelion passage. For example, using an epoch of 1996, Comet Hale–Bopp shows perihelion on 1 April 1997. Using an epoch of 2022 shows a less accurate perihelion date of 29 March 1997. Short-period comets can be even more sensitive to the epoch selected. Using an epoch of 2005 shows 101P/Chernykh coming to perihelion on 25 December 2005, but using an epoch of 2012 produces a less accurate unperturbed perihelion date of 20 January 2006.

Two body solution vs n-body solution for 12P/Pons–Brooks time of perihelion passage
Epoch	Date of perihelion (tp)
2010	2024-Apr-19.892
n-body	2024-Apr-21.139
2018	2024-Apr-23.069

Numerical integration shows dwarf planet Eris will come to perihelion in December 2257. Using an epoch of 2026 less accurately shows Eris coming to perihelion in 2256.

10 Hygiea will come to perihelion on 15 February 2028, but using a two-body solution at an epoch of June 2026 less accurately shows Hygiea will come to perihelion on 11 February 2028.

=== Short observation periods ===
Trans-Neptunian objects that are discovered when they are more than 80 AU from the Sun present a major challenge for astronomers. Because these objects move extremely slowly across the sky, scientists need many observations taken over several years to accurately determine their orbital paths.

When astronomers have only limited data—like when there were only 8 observations of object 2015 TH367 collected over just one year—the uncertainty becomes enormous. For objects that won’t reach their closest point to the Sun (perihelion) for roughly 100 years, this limited data can lead to massive uncertainties. In the case of 2015 TH367, scientists originally estimated the perihelion date could be off by plus or minus 77.3 years (28,220 days) (a 1-sigma uncertainty) —that’s nearly an entire human lifetime of uncertainty.

This demonstrates why tracking these distant objects requires patience and long-term observation campaigns to pin down their true orbital characteristics.

== See also ==
- Distance of closest approach
- Eccentric anomaly
- Flyby (spaceflight)
- Hyperbolic trajectory § Closest approach
- Mean anomaly
- Perifocal coordinate system
- True anomaly
