= Orbital plane =

Concept in geometry and physics

An orbital plane as viewed relative to a plane of reference.

An orbital plane can also be seen in relative to conic sections, in which the orbital path is defined as the intersection between a plane and a cone. Parabolic (1) and hyperbolic (3) orbits are escape orbits, whereas elliptical and circular orbits (2) are captive.

The orbital plane of a revolving body is the geometric plane in which its orbit lies. Three non-collinear points in space suffice to determine an orbital plane. A common example would be the positions of the centers of a massive body (host) and of an orbiting celestial body at two different times/points of its orbit.

The orbital plane is defined in relation to a reference plane by two parameters: inclination (i) and longitude of the ascending node (Ω).

By definition, the reference plane for the Solar System is usually considered to be Earth's orbital plane, which defines the ecliptic, the circular path on the celestial sphere that the Sun appears to follow over the course of a year.

In other cases, for instance a moon or artificial satellite orbiting another planet, it is convenient to define the inclination of the object's orbit as the angle between its orbital plane and the planet's equatorial plane.

The coordinate system defined that uses the orbital plane as the $xy$ plane is known as the perifocal coordinate system.

== Artificial satellites around the Earth ==
For launch vehicles and artificial satellites, the orbital plane is a defining parameter of an orbit; as in general, it will take a very large amount of propellant to change the orbital plane of an object. Other parameters, such as the orbital period, the eccentricity of the orbit and the phase of the orbit are more easily changed by propulsion systems.

Orbital planes of satellites are perturbed by the non-spherical nature of the Earth's gravity. This causes the orbital plane of the satellite's orbit to slowly rotate around the Earth, depending on the angle the plane makes with the Earth's equator. For planes that are at a critical angle this can mean that the plane will track the Sun around the Earth, forming a Sun-synchronous orbit.

A launch vehicle's launch window is usually determined by the times when the target orbital plane intersects the launch site.

== See also ==
- Earth-centered inertial coordinate system
- ECEF, Earth-Centered Earth-fixed coordinate system
- Invariable plane, a weighted average of all orbital planes in a system
- Orbital elements
- Orbital state vectors
- Perifocal coordinate system
