= Orbit =

Curved path of an object around a point

Variation of orbital eccentricity 0.0 0.2 0.4 0.6 0.8

In celestial mechanics, an orbit is the curved trajectory of an object under the influence of an attracting force. Alternatively, it is known as an orbital revolution, because it is a rotation around an axis external to the moving body. Examples for orbits include the trajectory of a planet around a star, a natural satellite around a planet, or an artificial satellite around an object or position in space such as a planet, moon, asteroid, or Lagrange point. Normally, orbit refers to a regularly repeating trajectory, although it may also refer to a non-repeating trajectory. To a close approximation, planets, and satellites follow elliptic orbits, with the center of mass being orbited at a focal point of the ellipse, as described by Kepler's laws of planetary motion.

Planets revolve around a star, a natural satellite around a planet, or an artificial satellite around an object or position in space such as a planet, moon, asteroid, or Lagrange point.

For most situations, orbital motion is adequately approximated by Newtonian mechanics, which explains gravity as a force obeying an inverse-square law. However, Albert Einstein's general theory of relativity, which accounts for gravity as due to curvature of spacetime, with orbits following geodesics, provides a more accurate calculation and understanding of the exact mechanics of orbital motion.

== History ==
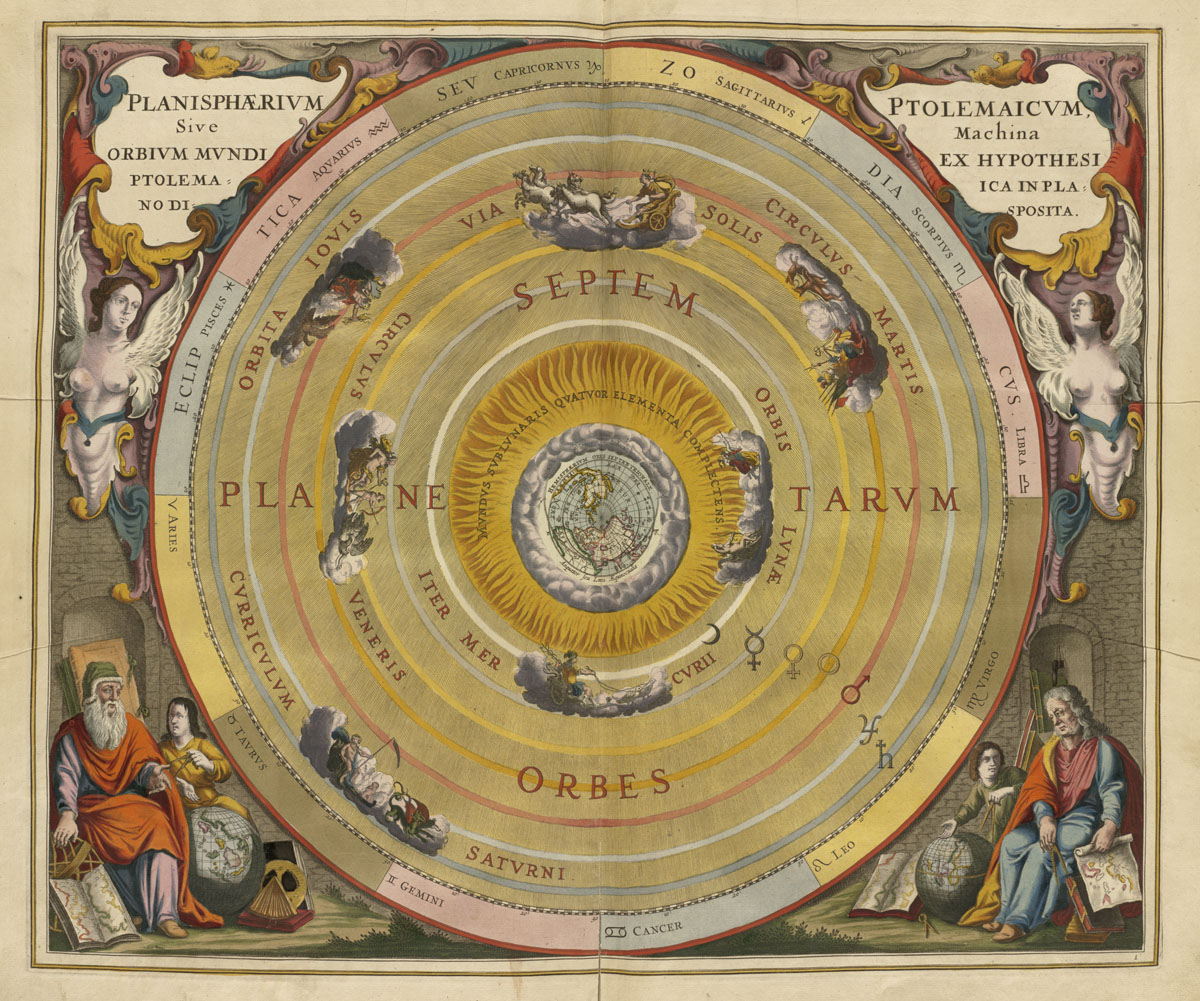
The Earth-centered universe according to Ptolemy; illustration by Andreas Cellarius from Harmonia Macrocosmica, 1660

Historically, the apparent motions of the planets were described by European and Arabic philosophers using the idea of celestial spheres. This model posited the existence of perfect moving spheres or rings to which the stars and planets were attached. It assumed the heavens were fixed apart from the motion of the spheres and was developed without any understanding of gravity. This concept originated with Hellenistic astronomy, particularly Eudoxus and Aristotle. After the planets' motions were more accurately measured, theoretical mechanisms such as deferent and epicycles were added by Ptolemy. Although the model was capable of reasonably accurately predicting the planets' positions in the sky, more, and more epicycles were required as the measurements became more accurate, hence the model became increasingly unwieldy. Originally geocentric, it was modified by Copernicus to place the Sun at the centre to help simplify the model. The model was further challenged during the 16th century, as comets were observed traversing the spheres.

Distance from Sun vs. orbital period for Solar System bodies. Each object lies along the same line because the Sun has a much higher mass.

The basis for the modern description of orbits was first formulated by Johannes Kepler whose results are summarised in his three laws of planetary motion. First, he found that the orbits of the planets in the Solar System are elliptical, not circular (or epicyclic), as had previously been believed, and that the Sun is not located at the center of the orbits, but rather at one focus. Second, he found that the orbital speed of each planet is not constant, as had previously been thought, but rather that the speed depends on the planet's distance from the Sun. Third, Kepler found a universal relationship between the orbital properties of all the planets orbiting the Sun. For the planets, the cubes of their distances from the Sun are proportional to the squares of their orbital periods.

Jupiter and Venus, for example, are respectively about 5.2 and 0.723 AU distant from the Sun, their orbital periods respectively about 11.86 and 0.615 years. The proportionality is seen by the fact that the ratio for Jupiter:

$$\tfrac{5.204^3}{11.862^2} \approxeq 1.002$$

is practically equal to that for Venus,

$$\tfrac{0.723^3}{0.615^2} \approxeq 0.999$$

in accord with the relationship. Idealised orbits meeting these rules are known as Kepler orbits.

Isaac Newton demonstrated that Kepler's laws were derivable from his theory of gravitation, and that, in general, the orbits of bodies subject to gravity were conic sections, under his assumption that the force of gravity propagates instantaneously. To satisfy Kepler's third law, Newton showed that, for a pair of bodies, the orbit size (a), orbital period (T), and their combined masses (M) are related to each other by:

$$T^2 \propto \frac{a^3}{M}$$

and that those bodies orbit their common center of mass. Where one body is much more massive than the other (as is the case of an artificial satellite orbiting a planet), it is a convenient approximation to take the center of mass as coinciding with the center of the more massive body.

Advances in Newtonian mechanics were then used to explore variations from the simple assumptions behind Kepler orbits, such as the perturbations due to other bodies, or the impact of spheroidal rather than spherical bodies. Joseph-Louis Lagrange developed a new approach to Newtonian mechanics emphasizing energy more than force, and made progress on the three-body problem, discovering the Lagrangian points with Euler. In a dramatic vindication of classical mechanics, in 1846 Urbain Le Verrier was able to predict the position of Neptune based on unexplained perturbations in the orbit of Uranus.

Albert Einstein in his 1916 paper The Foundation of the General Theory of Relativity explained that gravity was due to curvature of space-time and removed Newton's assumption that changes in gravity propagate instantaneously. This led astronomers to recognize that Newtonian mechanics did not provide the highest accuracy in understanding orbits. In relativity theory, orbits follow geodesic trajectories which are usually approximated very well by the Newtonian predictions (except where there are very strong gravity fields and very high speeds) but the differences are measurable. Essentially all the experimental evidence that can distinguish between the theories agrees with relativity theory to within experimental measurement accuracy. The original vindication of general relativity is that it was able to account for the remaining unexplained amount in precession of Mercury's perihelion first noted by Le Verrier. However, Newton's solution is still used for most short term purposes since it is significantly easier to use, and sufficiently accurate.

== Planetary orbits ==
Motion of the barycenter of the Solar System relative to the Sun, 2000–2050

The apsides of an object in an elliptical orbit with the Sun

Within a planetary system, various non-stellar objects follow elliptical orbits around the system's barycenter. These objects include planets, dwarf planets, asteroids and other minor planets, comets, meteoroids, and even space debris. A comet in a parabolic or hyperbolic orbit about a barycenter is not gravitationally bound to the star and therefore is not considered part of the star's planetary system. Bodies that are gravitationally bound to one of the planets in a planetary system, including natural satellites, artificial satellites, and the objects within ring systems, follow orbits about a barycenter near or within that planet.

Owing to mutual gravitational perturbations, the eccentricities and inclinations of the planetary orbits vary over time. Mercury, the smallest planet in the Solar System, has the most eccentric orbit. At the present epoch, Mars has the next largest eccentricity while the smallest orbital eccentricities are seen with Venus and Neptune.

As two objects orbit each other, the periapsis is that point at which the two objects are closest to each other. Less properly, "perifocus" or "pericentron" are used. The apoapsis is that point at which they are the farthest, or sometimes apifocus or apocentron. A line drawn from periapsis to apoapsis is the line-of-apsides. This is the major axis of the ellipse, the line through its longest part.

More specific terms are used for specific bodies. For example, perigee and apogee are the lowest and highest parts of an orbit around Earth, while perihelion and aphelion are the closest and farthest points of an orbit around the Sun. Things orbiting the Moon have a perilune and apolune (or periselene and aposelene respectively). An orbit around any star, not just the Sun, has a periastron and an apastron.

In the case of planets orbiting a star, the mass of the star, and all its satellites are calculated to be at a single point called the barycenter. The individual satellites of that star follow their own elliptical orbits with the barycenter at one focal point of that ellipse. At any point along its orbit, any satellite will have a certain value of kinetic and potential energy with respect to the barycenter and the sum of those two energies is a constant value at every point along its orbit. As a result, as a planet approaches periapsis, the planet will increase in speed as its potential energy decreases; as a planet approaches apoapsis, its velocity will decrease as its potential energy increases.

== Principles ==
An orbit can be explained by combining Newton's laws of motion with his law of universal gravitation. The laws of motion are as follows:

- A body continues in a state of uniform rest or motion unless acted upon by an external force.
- The acceleration produced when a force acts is directly proportional to the force and takes place in the direction in which the force acts.
- To every action there is an equal and opposite reaction.

By the first law of motion, in the absence of gravity, a physical object will continue to move in a straight line due to inertia. According to the second law, a force, such as gravity, pulls the moving object toward the body that is the source of the force, and thus causes the object to follow a curved trajectory. If the object has enough tangential velocity, it will not fall into the gravitating body but can instead continue to follow the curved trajectory caused by the force indefinitely. The object is then said to be orbiting the body. According to the third law, each body applies an equal force on the other, which means the two bodies orbit around their center of mass, or barycenter.

A gravity assist fly-by uses a hyperbolic orbit to change a spacecraft's velocity and heading

Because of the law of universal gravitation, the strength of the gravitational force depends on the masses of the two bodies, and their separation. As the gravity varies over the course of the orbit, it reproduces Kepler's laws of planetary motion. Depending on the evolving energy state of the system, the velocity relationship of two moving objects with mass can be considered in four practical classes, with subtypes:

No orbit
Suborbital trajectories
a range of interrupted elliptical paths
Orbital trajectories (or simply, orbits)
- Range of elliptical paths with closest point opposite firing point
- Circular path
- Range of elliptical paths with closest point at firing point
Open (or escape) trajectories
- Parabolic paths
- Hyperbolic paths

To achieve orbit, conventional rockets are launched vertically at first to lift the rocket above the dense lower atmosphere (which causes frictional drag), and gradually pitch over and finish firing the rocket engine parallel to the atmosphere to achieve orbital injection. Once in orbit, their speed keeps them above the atmosphere. If an elliptical orbit dips into dense air, the object will lose speed, and re-enter, falling to the ground. Occasionally a space craft will intentionally intercept the atmosphere, in an act commonly referred to as an aerobraking maneuver.

=== Illustration ===
Newton's cannonball, an illustration of how objects can "fall" in a curve

To illustrate an orbit around a planet, the Newton's cannonball model may prove useful (see image). This is a thought experiment, in which a cannon on top of a tall mountain is able to fire a cannonball horizontally at any chosen muzzle speed. The effects of air friction on the cannonball are ignored (or perhaps the mountain is high enough that the cannon is above the Earth's atmosphere, which is the same thing).

If the cannon fires its ball with a low initial speed, the trajectory of the ball curves downward, and hits the ground (A). As the firing speed is increased, the cannonball hits the ground farther (B) away from the cannon, because while the ball is still falling towards the ground, the ground is increasingly curving away from it (see first point, above). All these motions are actually technically "orbits"—they are describing a portion of an elliptical path around the center of gravity—but the orbits are interrupted by striking the Earth.

If the cannonball is fired with enough speed, the ground curves away from the ball at least as much as the ball falls—so the ball never hits the ground. It is now in what could be called a non-interrupted or circumnavigating, orbit. For any specific combination of height above the center of gravity and mass of the planet, there is one specific firing speed (unaffected by the mass of the ball, which is assumed to be very small relative to the Earth's mass) that produces a circular orbit, as shown in (C).

As the firing speed is increased beyond this, non-interrupted elliptic orbits are produced; one is shown in (D). If the initial firing is above the surface of the Earth as shown, there will also be non-interrupted elliptical orbits at slower firing speed; these will come closest to the Earth at the point half an orbit beyond, and directly opposite the firing point, below the circular orbit.

At a specific horizontal firing speed called escape velocity, dependent on the mass of the planet and the distance of the object from the barycenter, an open orbit (E) is achieved that has a parabolic path. At even greater speeds the object will follow a range of hyperbolic trajectories. In a practical sense, both of these trajectory types mean the object is "breaking free" of the planet's gravity, and "going off into space" potentially never to return. However, the object remains under the influence of the Sun's gravity.

== Newton's laws ==
=== Gravity and motion ===
In most real-world situations, Newton's laws provide a reasonably accurate description of motion of objects in a gravitational field. The adjustments needed to accommodate the theory of relativity become appreciable in cases where the object is in the proximity of a significant gravitational source such as a star, or a high level of accuracy is needed.

A rocket experiences a gravitational force g and acceleration from propulsion a_{e}, resulting in a net acceleration a.

The acceleration of a body is equal to the combination of the forces acting on it, divided by its mass. The gravitational force acting on a body is proportional to the product of the masses of the two attracting bodies and decreases inversely with the square of the distance between them. For a two-body problem, defined as an isolated system of two spherical bodies with known masses and sufficient separation, this Newtonian approximation of their gravitational interaction can provide a reasonably accurate calculation of their trajectories.

If the heavier body is much more massive than the smaller, as in the case of a satellite or small moon orbiting a planet or for the Earth orbiting the Sun, it is accurate enough, and convenient to describe the motion in terms of a coordinate system that is centered on the heavier body, and we say that the lighter body is in orbit around the heavier. For the case where the masses of two bodies are comparable, an exact Newtonian solution is still sufficient, and can be had by placing the coordinate system at the center of the mass of the system.

=== Energy and conic sections ===
Energy is associated with gravitational fields. A stationary body far from another can do external work if it is pulled towards it, and therefore has gravitational potential energy. Since work is required to separate two bodies against the pull of gravity, their gravitational potential energy increases as they are separated and decreases as they approach one another. For point masses, the gravitational energy decreases to zero as they approach zero separation. It is convenient and conventional to assign the potential energy as having zero value when they are an infinite distance apart, and hence it has a negative value (since it decreases from zero) for smaller finite distances.

When only two gravitational bodies interact, their orbits follow a conic section. The orbit can be open (implying the object never returns) or closed (returning). Which it is depends on the total energy (kinetic + potential energy) of the system. In the case of an open orbit, the speed at any position of the orbit is at least the escape velocity for that position, in the case of a closed orbit, the speed is always less than the escape velocity. Since the kinetic energy is never negative if the common convention is adopted of taking the potential energy as zero at infinite separation, the bound orbits will have negative total energy, the parabolic trajectories zero total energy and hyperbolic orbits positive total energy.

Conic sections for different orbit types

An open orbit will have a parabolic shape if it has the velocity of exactly the escape velocity at that point in its trajectory, and it will have the shape of a hyperbola when its velocity is greater than the escape velocity. When two bodies approach each other with escape velocity or greater (relative to each other), they will briefly curve around each other at the time of their closest approach, and then separate, and fly apart.

All closed orbits have the shape of an ellipse. A circular orbit is a special case, wherein the foci of the ellipse coincide.

=== Kepler's laws ===
Bodies following closed orbits repeat their paths with a certain time called the period. This motion is described by the empirical laws of Kepler, which can be mathematically derived from Newton's laws. These can be formulated as follows:

1. The orbit of a planet around the Sun is an ellipse, with the Sun in one of the focal points of that ellipse. [This focal point is actually the barycenter of the Sun-planet system; for simplicity, this explanation assumes the Sun's mass is infinitely larger than that planet's.] The planet's orbit lies in a plane, called the orbital plane.
2. As the planet moves in its orbit, the line from the Sun to the planet sweeps a constant area of the orbital plane for a given period of time, regardless of which part of its orbit the planet traces during that period of time. This means that the planet moves faster near its perihelion than near its aphelion, because at the smaller distance it needs to trace a greater arc to cover the same area. This law is usually stated as "equal areas in equal time."
3. For a given orbit, the ratio of the cube of its semi-major axis to the square of its period is constant.

=== Limitations of classical mechanics ===
Ideally, the bound orbits of a point mass or a spherical body with a Newtonian gravitational field form closed ellipses, which repeat the same path exactly, and indefinitely. However, any non-spherical or non-Newtonian effects will cause the orbit's shape to depart from the ellipse. Such effects can be caused by a slight oblateness of the body, mass anomalies, tidal deformations, or relativistic effects, thereby changing the gravitational field's behavior with distance.

The two-body solutions were published by Newton in Principia in 1687. In 1912, Karl Fritiof Sundman developed a converging infinite series that solves the general three-body problem; however, it converges too slowly to be of much use. The restricted three-body problem, in which the third body is assumed to have negligible mass, has been extensively studied. The solutions to this case include the Lagrangian points. In the case of lunar theory, the 19th century work of Charles-Eugène Delaunay allowed the motions of the Moon to be predicted to within its own diameter over a 20-year period. No universally valid method is known to solve the equations of motion for a system with four or more bodies.

== Formulation ==
=== Newtonian analysis of orbital motion ===
The following derivation applies to an elliptical orbit. The assumption is that the central body is massive enough that it can be considered to be stationary and so the more subtle effects of general relativity can be ignored.

==== Force and acceleration ====
Gravitational force for masses m_{1} and m_{2} with separation r

The Newtonian law of gravitation states that the gravitational acceleration of the second mass towards the central body is related to the inverse of the square of the distance between them, namely:

$$F_2 = -\frac {G m_1 m_2}{r^2}$$

where F_{2} is the force acting on the mass m_{2} caused by the gravitational attraction mass m_{1} has for m_{2}, G is the universal gravitational constant, and r is the distance between the two masses centers.

From Newton's second law, the summation of the forces acting on m_{2} related to that body's acceleration:

$$F_2 = m_2 A_2$$

where A_{2} is the acceleration of m_{2} caused by the force of gravitational attraction F_{2} of m_{1} acting on m_{2}.

Combining Eq. 1 and 2:

$$-\frac {G  m_1  m_2}{r^2} = m_2  A_2$$

Solving for the acceleration, A_{2}:

$$A_2 = \frac{F_2}{m_2} = - \frac{1}{m_2} \frac{G m_1 m_2}{r^2} =  -\frac{\mu}{r^2}$$

where $\mu\,$ is the standard gravitational parameter, in this case $G m_1$. It is understood that the system being described is m_{2}, hence the subscripts can be dropped.

==== Polar coordinates ====
Unit vectors in polar coordinates

The position of the orbiting object at the current time $t$ is located in the orbital plane using vector calculus in polar coordinates, both with the standard Euclidean basis and with the polar basis with the origin coinciding with the center of force. Let $r$ be the distance between the object and the center and $\theta$ be the angle it has rotated. Let $\hat{\mathbf{x}}$ and $\hat{\mathbf{y}}$ be the standard Euclidean bases and let:

$$\hat{\mathbf{r}} = \cos(\theta)\hat{\mathbf{x}} + \sin(\theta)\hat{\mathbf{y}}$$
$$\hat{\boldsymbol \theta} = - \sin(\theta)\hat{\mathbf{x}} + \cos(\theta)\hat{\mathbf{y}}$$

be the radial and transverse polar basis. The first is the unit vector pointing from the central body to the current location of the orbiting object and the second is the orthogonal unit vector pointing in the direction that the orbiting object would travel if orbiting in a counter clockwise circle. Then the vector to the orbiting object is:

$${\mathbf{O}} = r \cos(\theta)\hat{\mathbf{x}} + r \sin(\theta)\hat{\mathbf{y}} = r \hat{\mathbf{r}}$$

Newton's notation $\dot r$ and $\dot \theta$ denotes the standard derivatives of how this distance and angle change over time. Taking the derivative of a vector to see how it changes over a tiny increment of time, $\delta t$, subtracts its location at time $t + \delta t$ from that at time $t$ and divides by $\delta t$. The result remains a vector.

==== Kepler's second law ====
Because the basis vector $\hat{\mathbf{r}}$ moves as the object orbits, the first step is to differentiate it to determine the radial rate of change with time. From time $t$ to $t + \delta t$, the vector $\hat{\mathbf{r}}$ keeps its beginning at the origin and rotates from angle $\theta$ to $\theta + \dot \theta\ \delta t$, which moves its head a distance $\dot \theta\ \delta t$ in the perpendicular direction $\hat{\boldsymbol \theta}$, giving a derivative of $\dot \theta \hat{\boldsymbol \theta}$.

$$\begin{align}
\hat{\mathbf{r}}
&= \cos(\theta)\hat{\mathbf{x}} + \sin(\theta)\hat{\mathbf{y}} \\
\frac{\delta \hat{\mathbf{r}}}{\delta t} = \dot{\mathbf r}
&= -\sin(\theta)\dot \theta \hat{\mathbf{x}} + \cos(\theta)\dot \theta \hat{\mathbf{y}} = \dot \theta \hat{\boldsymbol \theta} \\
\hat{\boldsymbol \theta}
&= -\sin(\theta)\hat{\mathbf{x}} + \cos(\theta)\hat{\mathbf{y}} \\
\frac{\delta \hat{\boldsymbol \theta}}{\delta t} = \dot{\boldsymbol \theta}
&= -\cos(\theta)\dot \theta \hat{\mathbf{x}} - \sin(\theta) \dot \theta \hat{\mathbf{y}} = -\dot \theta \hat{\mathbf r}
\end{align}$$

The velocity and acceleration of the orbiting object can now be determined.

$$\begin{align}
{\mathbf{O}} &= r \hat{\mathbf{r}} \\
\dot{\mathbf{O}} &= \frac{\delta r}{\delta t} \hat{\mathbf{r}} + r \frac{\delta \hat{\mathbf{r}}}{\delta t}
= \dot r \hat {\mathbf r} + r \left[ \dot \theta \hat {\boldsymbol \theta} \right] \\
\ddot{\mathbf{O}} &= \left[\ddot r \hat {\mathbf r} + \dot r \dot \theta \hat {\boldsymbol \theta}\right] +
\left[\dot r \dot \theta \hat {\boldsymbol \theta} +
r \ddot \theta \hat {\boldsymbol \theta} -
r \dot \theta^2 \hat {\mathbf r}
\right] \\
&= \left[\ddot r - r\dot\theta^2\right]\hat{\mathbf{r}} +
\left[r \ddot\theta + 2 \dot r \dot\theta\right] \hat{\boldsymbol \theta}
\end{align}$$

In the last line, the coefficients of $\hat{\mathbf{r}}$ and $\hat{\boldsymbol \theta}$ give the accelerations in the radial and transverse directions. As said, Newton gives the first due to gravity as $-\mu/r^2$ and the second is zero per Newton's first law. Thus:

$\ddot r - r\dot\theta^2 = - \frac{\mu}{r^2}$	1

$r \ddot\theta + 2 \dot r \dot\theta = 0$	2

For a time interval t, the rate of angular change $\dot \theta$ varies to maintain a constant area A

Equation (2) can be rearranged using integration by parts.

$$r \ddot\theta + 2 \dot r \dot\theta = \frac{1}{r}\frac{d}{dt}\left( r^2 \dot \theta \right) = 0$$

Both sides can now be multiplied through by $r$ because it is not zero unless the orbiting object crashes. Having the derivative be zero indicates that the function is a constant.

$r^2 \dot \theta = h$	3

which is actually the theoretical proof of Kepler's second law (A line joining a planet and the Sun sweeps out equal areas during equal intervals of time). The constant of integration, h, is the angular momentum per unit mass.

==== Kepler's first law ====
In order to get an equation for the orbit from equation (1), the time variable needs to be eliminated. (See also Binet equation.) In polar coordinates, this would express the distance $r$ of the orbiting object from the center as a function of its angle $\theta$. However, it is easier to introduce the auxiliary variable $u = 1/r$ and to express $u$ as a function of $\theta$. Derivatives of $r$ with respect to time may be rewritten as derivatives of $u$ with respect to angle.

$$u = { 1 \over r }$$
$\dot\theta = \frac{h}{r^2} = hu^2$ (reworking (3))
$$\begin{align}
\frac{\delta u}{\delta \theta} &= \frac{\delta}{\delta t}\left(\frac{1}{r}\right)\frac{\delta t}{\delta \theta } = -\frac{\dot{r}}{r^2\dot{\theta }} = -\frac{\dot{r}}{h} \\
\frac{\delta^2 u}{\delta \theta^2} &= -\frac{1}{h}\frac{\delta \dot{r}}{\delta t}\frac{\delta t}{\delta \theta } = -\frac{\ddot{r}}{h\dot{\theta}} = -\frac{\ddot{r}}{h^2 u^2}
\ \ \ \text{ or } \ \ \  \ddot r = - h^2 u^2 \frac{\delta^2 u}{\delta \theta^2}
\end{align}$$

Plugging these into (1) gives

$$\begin{align}
\ddot r - r\dot\theta^2 &= -\frac{\mu}{r^2} \\
-h^2 u^2 \frac{\delta^2 u}{\delta \theta^2} - \frac{1}{u} \left(h u^2\right)^2 &= -\mu u^2
\end{align}$$

Hence:

$\frac{\delta^2 u}{\delta \theta^2} + u = \frac{\mu}{h^2}$	4

So for the gravitational force – or, more generally, for any inverse square force law – the right hand side of the equation becomes a constant and the equation is seen to be the harmonic equation (up to a shift of origin of the dependent variable). The solution is:

$$u(\theta) = \frac\mu {h^2} + A \cos(\theta - \theta_0)$$

Polar coordinates centered at focus. The semi-major axis a is the distance from the center (C) to an apsis (A or B).

where A and θ_{0} are arbitrary constants. This resulting equation of the orbit of the object is that of an ellipse in Polar form relative to one of the focal points. This is put into a more standard form by letting $e \equiv h^2 A/\mu$ be the eccentricity, which when rearranged we see:

$$u(\theta) = \frac\mu {h^2} (1+ e\cos(\theta - \theta_0))$$

Note that by letting $a \equiv h^2/\mu\left(1 - e^2\right)$ be the semi-major axis and letting $\theta_0 \equiv 0$ so the long axis of the ellipse is along the positive x coordinate yields:

$$r(\theta) = \frac{a \left(1 - e^2\right)}{1 + e\cos\theta}$$

When e is zero, the result is a circular orbit with r equal to a.

==== Kepler's third law ====
Incorporating Newton's laws, the constant in Kepler's third law can be shown to be:

$$\frac{a^3}{T^2} = \frac{G(M + m)}{4\pi^2} \approx \frac{GM}{4\pi^2} \approx 7.496 \times 10^{-6} \frac{\text{AU}^3}{\text{days}^2}$$

where $M$ is the mass of the Sun, G is the gravitational constant, $m$ is the mass of the planet, $T$ is the orbital period and $a$ is the elliptical semi-major axis, and $\text{AU}$ is the astronomical unit, the average distance from earth to the sun. From this, the orbital period can be derived from the semi-major axis.

==== Applying torque ====
A torque to a satellite can result, for example, due to perturbation from a non-sperical mass. When the two-body system is under the influence of torque, the angular momentum h is not a constant. After the following calculation:

$$\begin{align}
\frac{\delta r}{\delta \theta} &= -\frac{1}{u^2} \frac{\delta u}{\delta \theta} = -\frac{h}{m} \frac{\delta u}{\delta \theta} \\
\frac{\delta^2 r}{\delta \theta^2} &= -\frac{h^2u^2}{m^2} \frac{\delta^2 u}{\delta \theta^2} - \frac{hu^2}{m^2} \frac{\delta h}{\delta \theta} \frac{\delta u}{\delta \theta} \\
\left(\frac{\delta \theta}{\delta t}\right)^2 r &= \frac{h^2 u^3}{m^2}
\end{align}$$

The result is the Sturm-Liouville equation of two-body system.

$\frac{\delta}{\delta \theta} \left(h \frac{\delta u}{\delta \theta}\right) + hu = \frac{\mu}{h}$	5

=== Relativistic orbital motion ===
The classical (Newtonian) analysis of orbital mechanics assumes that the more subtle effects of general relativity, such as frame dragging and gravitational time dilation are negligible. Relativistic effects cease to be negligible when near massive bodies (as with the precession of Mercury's orbit about the Sun), or when extreme precision is needed (as with calculations of the orbital elements and time signal references for GPS satellites.)

Because of general relativity, there exists a smallest possible radius for which a particle can stably orbit a black hole. Any inward perturbation to this orbit will lead to the particle spiraling into the black hole. The size of this innermost stable circular orbit depends on the spin of the black hole and the spin of the particle itself, but with no rotation the theoretical orbital radius is just three times the radius of the event horizon.

== Specification ==
Elements of an elliptical orbit, showing the orbital plane alignment is given by the inclination, longitude of the ascending node and argument of periapsis

Six parameters are required to specify a Keplerian orbit about a body. For example, the three numbers that specify the body's initial position and the three values that specify its velocity will define a unique orbit that can be calculated forwards (or backwards) in time.

An unperturbed orbit is two-dimensional in a plane fixed in space, known as the orbital plane. In three dimensions, the orientation of this plane relative to a plane of reference, such as the plane of the sky, can be determined by three angles. Extending the analysis to three dimensions requires simply rotating the two-dimensional plane to the required angles relative to the poles of the planetary body involved.

By tradition, the standard set of orbital elements is called the set of Keplerian elements, after Johannes Kepler and his laws. These six Keplerian elements are as follows:

- Inclination (i)
- Longitude of the ascending node (Ω)
- Argument of periapsis (ω)
- Eccentricity (e)
- Semimajor axis (a)
- True anomaly at epoch (θ_{0}).

The orbital period is simply how long an orbiting body takes to complete one orbit, which can be derived from the semimajor axis, and the combined masses. In principle, once the orbital elements are known for a body, its position can be calculated forward, and backward indefinitely in time. However, in practice, orbits are affected or perturbed, by other forces than simple gravity from an assumed point source, and thus the orbital elements change over time.

Note that, unless the eccentricity is zero, a is not the average orbital radius. The time-averaged orbital distance is given by:

$$\bar{r} = a \left(1 + \frac{e^2}{2} \right)$$

which only equals a when e is zero, for a circular orbit.

== Perturbations ==
An orbital perturbation is when a force or impulse causes an acceleration that changes the parameters of the orbit over time. This perturbation is much smaller than the overall force or average impulse of the main gravitating body. Potential sources of perturbation include departure from sphericity, third body contributions, radiation pressure, atmospheric drag, and tidal acceleration.

=== Radial, transverse and normal perturbations ===
A Hohmann transfer orbit is a maneuver to change the altitude of an orbit (from 1 to 3) with two tangential impulses (Δv and Δv')

For a body in orbit, a perturbing force can be divided into three orthogonal components: radial, transverse and normal. The first two are in the orbital plane (in the direction of the gravitating body and along the path of a circular orbit, respectively) and the third is away from the orbital plane. A small radial impulse given to a body in orbit changes the eccentricity, but not the orbital period (to first order). A prograde or retrograde transverse impulse (i.e. an impulse applied along the orbital motion) changes both the eccentricity and the orbital period. Notably, a prograde impulse at periapsis raises the altitude at apoapsis and vice versa and a retrograde impulse does the opposite. A normal impulse (out of the orbital plane) causes rotation of the orbital plane without changing the period or eccentricity. In all instances, a closed orbit will still intersect the perturbation point.

=== Orbital decay ===
For an object in a close enough orbit about a body with a significant atmosphere, the orbit can decay because of drag. Particularly at each periapsis, the object experiences atmospheric drag, losing energy. Each time, the orbit grows less eccentric (more circular) because the object loses kinetic energy precisely when that energy is at its maximum. This is similar to the effect of slowing a pendulum at its lowest point; the highest point of the pendulum's swing becomes lower. Eventually, the effect becomes so great that the maximum kinetic energy is not enough to return the orbit above the limits of the atmospheric drag effect. When this happens the body will rapidly spiral down and intersect the central body.

The region for experiencing atmospheric drag varies by planet; a re-entry vehicle needs to draw much closer to Mars than to Earth, for example, and the drag is negligible for Mercury. The bounds of an atmosphere vary significantly due to solar forcing and space weather. During a solar maximum, the Earth's atmosphere causes drag up to a hundred kilometres higher than during a solar minimum.

Orbits can be artificially influenced through the use of rocket engines, which change the kinetic energy of the body at some point in its path. In this way, changes in the orbit shape or orientation can be facilitated. Solar sails or magnetic sails are forms of propulsion that require no propellant or energy input other than that of the Sun, and so can be used indefinitely for station keeping. (See statite for one such proposed use.) Satellites with long conductive tethers can experience orbital decay because of electromagnetic drag from the Earth's magnetic field. As the wire cuts the magnetic field it acts as a generator, moving electrons from one end to the other. The orbital energy is converted to heat in the wire.

For objects below the synchronous orbit for the body they're orbiting, orbital decay can occur due to tidal forces. The gravity of the orbiting object raises tidal bulges in the primary, and since it is below the synchronous orbit, the orbiting object is moving faster than the body's surface so the bulges lag a short angle behind it. The gravity of the bulges is slightly off of the primary-satellite axis and thus has a component along the direction of the satellite's motion. The near bulge slows the object more than the far bulge speeds it up, and as a result, the orbit decays.

Conversely, the gravity of the satellite on the bulges applies torque on the primary and speeds up its rotation. Artificial satellites are too small to have an appreciable tidal effect on the planets they orbit, but several moons in the Solar System are undergoing orbital decay by this mechanism. Mars' innermost moon Phobos is a prime example and is expected to either impact Mars' surface or break up into a ring in 20 to 40 million years.

Orbits can decay via the emission of gravitational waves. This mechanism is extremely weak for most stellar objects, only becoming significant in cases where there is a combination of extreme mass, and extreme acceleration, such as compact objects that orbit each other closely.

=== Oblateness ===
The standard analysis of orbiting bodies assumes that all bodies consist of uniform spheres, or more generally, concentric shells each of uniform density. Mathematically, such bodies are gravitationally equivalent to point sources per the shell theorem. However, in the real world, many bodies rotate and this introduces oblateness; known as an equatorial bulge. This adds a quadrupole moment to the gravitational field, which is significant at distances comparable to the radius of the body. In the general case, the gravitational potential of a rotating body such as a planet can be expanded in multipoles to account for the departure from spherical symmetry.

From the point of view of satellite dynamics, of particular relevance are the so-called even zonal harmonic coefficients, or even zonals, since they induce secular orbital perturbations which are cumulative over time spans longer than the orbital period. They do depend on the orientation of the body's symmetry axis in the space, affecting, in general, the whole orbit, with the exception of the semimajor axis.

=== Tidal locking ===
Tidal locking between a pair of co-orbiting astronomical bodies occurs when one of the objects reaches a state where there is no longer any net transfer of angular momentum over the course of a complete orbit. Their gravitational interaction forces steady changes to their orbits and rotation rates as a result of energy exchange and heat dissipation until the locked state is formed. The object tends to stay in this state because leaving it would require adding energy back into the system. An example is the planet Mercury, which is locked in a state of completing three rotations about its axis for every two orbits.

In the case where a tidally locked body possesses synchronous rotation, the object takes just as long to rotate around its own axis as it does to revolve around its partner. In this case, one side of the celestial body is permanently facing its host object. This is the case for the Earth's Moon and for both members of the Pluto-Charon system.

=== Multiple gravitating bodies ===
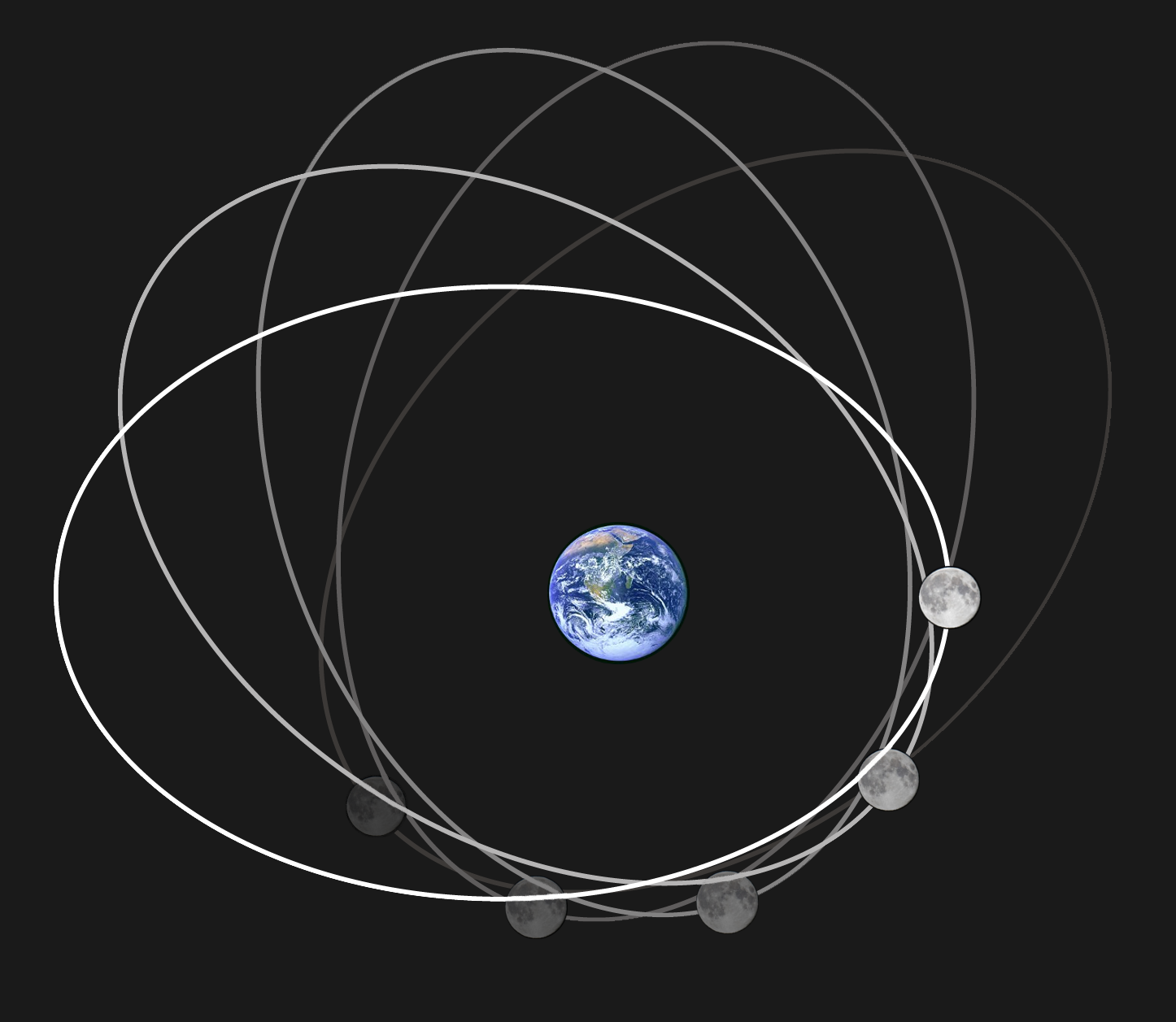
Apsidal precession of the Moon's elliptical orbit (not to scale and eccentricity exaggerated)

The effects of other gravitating bodies can be significant. For example, the orbit of the Moon cannot be accurately described without allowing for the action of the Sun's gravity as well as the Earth's. One approximate result is that bodies will usually have reasonably stable orbits around a heavier planet or moon, in spite of these perturbations, provided they are orbiting well within the heavier body's Hill sphere.

A long-term impact of multi-body interactions can be apsidal precession, which is a gradual rotation of the line between the apsides. For an elliptical system, the result is a rosetta orbit. The ancient Greek astronomer Hipparchus noted just such an apsidal precession of the Moon's orbit, as the revolution of the Moon's apogee with a period of approximately 8.85 years. Apsidal precession can result from tidal perturbation, rotational perturbation, general relativity, or a combination of these effects. The detection of apsidal precession in a distant binary star system can be an indicator of the purturbative effect of an unseen third stellar companion.

When there are more than two gravitating bodies it is referred to as an n-body problem. Most n-body problems have no closed form solution, although some special cases have been formulated.

=== Approaches to many-body problems ===
Rather than an exact closed form solution, orbits with many bodies can be approximated with arbitrarily high accuracy. One method is to take the pure elliptic motion as a basis and add perturbation terms to account for the gravitational influence of multiple bodies. This is convenient for calculating the positions of astronomical bodies. The equations of motion of the moons, planets and other bodies are known with great accuracy, and are used to generate tables for celestial navigation. Still, there are secular phenomena that have to be dealt with by post-Newtonian methods.

An incremental approach uses differential equations for scientific or mission-planning purposes. According to Newton's laws, each of the gravitational forces acting on a body will depend on the separation from the sources. Therefore, accelerations can be expressed in terms of positions. The perturbation terms are much easier to describe in this form. Predicting subsequent positions and velocities from initial values of position and velocity corresponds to solving an initial value problem. Numerical methods calculate the positions and velocities of the objects a short time in the future, then repeat the calculation ad nauseam. However, tiny arithmetic errors from the limited accuracy of a computer's math are cumulative, which limits the long-term accuracy of this approach.

Differential simulations with large numbers of objects perform the calculations in a hierarchical pairwise fashion between centers of mass. Using this scheme, galaxies, star clusters, and other large assemblages of objects have been simulated.

=== Radiation and magnetic fields ===
For smaller bodies particularly, light and stellar wind can cause significant perturbations to the attitude and direction of motion of the body, and over time can be significant. Objects with residual magnetic fields can interact with a planetary magnetosphere, perturbing their orbit. Of the planetary bodies, the motion of asteroids is particularly affected over large periods by the Yarkovsky effect when the asteroids are rotating relative to the Sun.

== Strange orbits ==
A simple hexagonal Klemperer rosette with two kinds of body, which Klemperer notes is the nearest to being stable.

Mathematicians have discovered that it is possible in principle to have multiple bodies in non-elliptical orbits that repeat periodically, although most such orbits are not stable regarding small perturbations in mass, position, or velocity. However, some special stable cases have been identified, including a planar figure-eight orbit occupied by three moving bodies. Further studies have discovered that nonplanar orbits are also possible, including one involving 12 masses moving in 4 roughly circular, interlocking orbits topologically equivalent to the edges of a cuboctahedron.

Finding such orbits naturally occurring in the universe is thought to be extremely unlikely, because of the improbability of the required conditions occurring by chance.

== Astrodynamics ==
Orbital mechanics or astrodynamics is the application of ballistics and celestial mechanics to the practical problems concerning the motion of rockets and other spacecraft. The motion of these objects is usually calculated from Newton's laws of motion and Newton's law of universal gravitation. It is a core discipline within space mission design and control. Celestial mechanics treats more broadly the orbital dynamics of systems under the influence of gravity, including spacecraft and natural astronomical bodies such as star systems, planets, moons, and comets. Orbital mechanics focuses on spacecraft trajectories, including orbital maneuvers, orbit plane changes and interplanetary transfers, and is used by mission planners to predict the results of propulsive maneuvers. General relativity is a more exact theory than Newton's laws for calculating orbits, and is sometimes necessary for greater accuracy or in high-gravity situations (such as orbits close to the Sun or planets).

== Earth orbits ==
- Low Earth orbit (LEO): Geocentric orbits with altitudes up to 2,000 km (0–1,240 miles).
- Medium Earth orbit (MEO): Geocentric orbits ranging in altitude from 2,000 km (1,240 miles) to just below geosynchronous orbit at 35,786 kilometers (22,236 mi). Also known as an intermediate circular orbit. These are "most commonly at 20,200 kilometers (12,600 mi), or 20,650 kilometers (12,830 mi), with an orbital period of 12 hours."
- Both geosynchronous orbit (GSO) and geostationary orbit (GEO) are orbits around Earth matching Earth's sidereal rotation period. All geosynchronous and geostationary orbits have a semi-major axis of 42,164 km (26,199 mi). All geostationary orbits are also geosynchronous, but not all geosynchronous orbits are geostationary. A geostationary orbit stays exactly above the equator, whereas a geosynchronous orbit may swing north, and south to cover more of the Earth's surface. Both complete one full orbit of Earth per sidereal day (relative to the stars, not the Sun).
- High Earth orbit: Geocentric orbits above the altitude of geosynchronous orbit 35,786 km (22,240 miles).

== Scaling in gravity ==
The gravitational constant G has been calculated as:6.6743×10^{−11} m^{3}⋅kg^{−1}⋅s^{−2}.

- (6.6742 ± 0.001) × 10^{−11} (kg/m^{3})^{−1}s^{−2}.

Thus the constant has dimension density^{−1} time^{−2}. This corresponds to the following properties.

Scaling of distances (including sizes of bodies, while keeping the densities the same) gives similar orbits without scaling the time: if for example distances are halved, masses are divided by 8, gravitational forces by 16 and gravitational accelerations by 2. Hence velocities are halved and orbital periods and other travel times related to gravity remain the same. For example, when an object is dropped from a tower, the time it takes to fall to the ground remains the same with a scale model of the tower on a scale model of the Earth.

Scaling of distances while keeping the masses the same (in the case of point masses, or by adjusting the densities) gives similar orbits; if distances are multiplied by 4, gravitational forces and accelerations are divided by 16, velocities are halved and orbital periods are multiplied by 8.

When all densities are multiplied by 4, orbits are the same; gravitational forces are multiplied by 16 and accelerations by 4, velocities are doubled and orbital periods are halved.

When all densities are multiplied by 4, and all sizes are halved, orbits are similar; masses are divided by 2, gravitational forces are the same, gravitational accelerations are doubled. Hence velocities are the same and orbital periods are halved.

In all these cases of scaling. if densities are multiplied by 4, times are halved; if velocities are doubled, forces are multiplied by 16.

These properties are illustrated in the formula (derived from the formula for the orbital period)

$$GT^2 \rho = 3\pi \left( \frac{a}{r} \right)^3,$$

for an elliptical orbit with semi-major axis a, of a small body around a spherical body with radius r and average density ρ, where T is the orbital period. See also Kepler’s third law.

== See also ==
- Free drift
- Jacobi coordinates
- List of orbits
- Molniya orbit
- Orbit determination
- Orbital spaceflight
- Perifocal coordinate system
- Polar orbit
- Radial trajectory
- VSOP model
