= Free drift =

Free drift mode refers to the state of motion of an object in orbit whereby constant attitude is not maintained. When attitude is lost, the object is said to be in free drift, thereby relying on its own inertia to avoid attitude drift.

This mode is often engaged purposefully as it can be useful when modifying, upgrading, or repairing an object in space, such as the International Space Station. Additionally, it allows work on areas near the thrusters on the ISS that are generally used to maintain attitude. While in free drift it is not possible to fully use the solar arrays on the ISS. This can cause a drop in power generation, requiring the conservation of energy. This may affect many systems that otherwise require a lot of energy.

The amount of time that an object such as the ISS can remain safely in free-drift varies depending on moment of inertia, perturbation torques, tidal gradients, etc. The ISS itself generally can last about 45 minutes in this mode.
