= Vladimir Kocharovsky =

Russian theoretical physicist

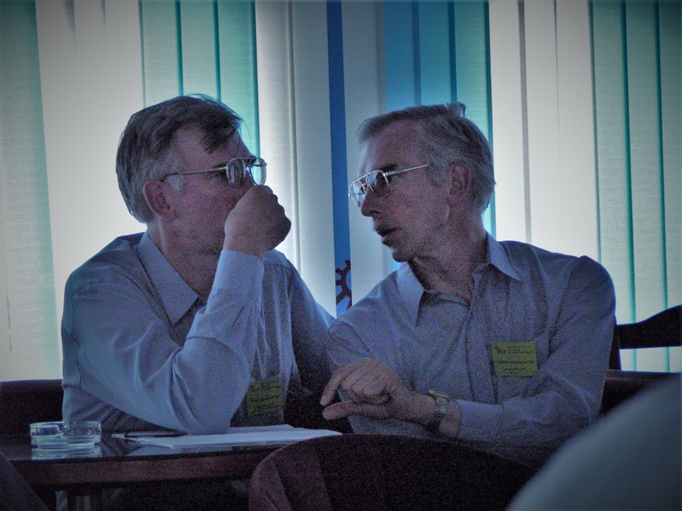
- Born: 15 October 1955 (age 71); Yekaterinburg, Russia
- Occupations: Physicist, academic and researcher
- Relatives: Vitaly Kocharovsky (brother)

Academic background
- Education: M.Sc., Physics and Mathematics; Ph.D., Physics and Mathematics
- Alma mater: N.I. Lobachevsky State University of Nizhny Novgorod; Radiophysical Research Institute, Nizhny Novgorod, Russia

Academic work
- Discipline: Theoretical physics Astrophysics
- Institutions: Russian Academy of Sciences; N.I. Lobachevsky State University of Nizhny Novgorod

Vladimir Kocharovsky is a Russian physicist, academic and researcher. He is a Head of the Astrophysics and Space Plasma Physics Department at the Institute of Applied Physics of the Russian Academy of Sciences (Nizhny Novgorod, Russia) and a professor at N.I. Lobachevsky State University of Nizhny Novgorod.

Kocharovsky has focused his research on topics in theoretical physics, including quantum gravity, critical phenomena, superradince, quantum optics, laser physics, semiconductor optoelectronics, wave propagation and mode coupling in inhomogeneous media, magnetospheric physics, plasma astrophysics, gamma- and radio-astronomy, and high-energy cosmic rays.

Kocharovsky has been elected as an academician of the Russian Academy of Sciences (RAS) in 2025 (a corresponding member in 2006). He is the Editor-in-Chief of the journal Radiophysics and Quantum Electronics since 2016, and has served on the editorial board of the journal Astronomy Letters since 2009.

== Education ==
Kocharovsky received his master's degree in Physics and Mathematics from N.I. Lobachevsky State University of Nizhny Novgorod, Russia in 1978 and Doctoral Degree in Physics and Mathematics from Radiophysical Research Institute in 1986. He was awarded Dr. of Sciences (Habilitation) Degree in Physics and Mathematics by the Highest Attestation Commission of the Russian Federation in 1998 after completing the habilitation thesis titled "Mode superradiance in open resonators and extreme regimes of generation of electromagnetic fields by ensembles of quantum and classical oscillators".

== Career ==
Kocharovsky joined the Institute of Applied Physics of the Russian Academy of Sciences in 1978 as a Researcher, and was promoted to Senior Researcher in 1986, to Leading Researcher in 1996, and became Chief Researcher in 2007. In 2012, he was appointed as a professor in Advanced School of General and Applied Physics at N.I. Lobachevsky State University of Nizhny Novgorod, Russia.

== Research ==
Kocharovsky has focused his research on the theoretical problems in physics and astrophysics, such as negative energy (dissipative) instabilities in quantum gravity, superradince, unification of nature's complexities via a matrix permanent, microscopic theory of critical phenomena in phase transitions, light–matter interaction in quantum optics and laser physics, nonadiabatic mode coupling, plasma astrophysics of neutron stars and black holes, structures and instabilities in a collisionless plasma, mechanisms of particle acceleration and emission, and origin of the ultrahigh-energy cosmic rays.

Kocharovsky found a negative-energy mechanism of instability in the quantum field theory of a gravity-matter system and discussed its manifestation in a cosmological model. He stated that a similar mechanism of a dissipative instability is responsible for a superradiance and predicted new regimes of superradiant lasing and nonequilibrium phase transitions in an atom-light system. In 1997, he predicted a phenomenon of a collective electron-positron annihilation and an electron-hole recombination. The latter phenomenon has been later observed experimentally. Kocharovsky developed also a method of a phenomenological quantum electrodynamics of active media for an analysis of such collective quantum instabilities in nonequilibrium systems.

In 2015, Kocharovsky suggested a microscopic theory of critical phenomena in phase transitions, in particular, for the Ising model of ferromagnetism and Bose-Einstein condensation (BEC). In 2020, he revealed a universality of a matrix permanent for description of major nature's complexities in critical phenomena, quantum information processes in many-body physics, fractal structures and chaos, number theory, and ♯P-hard problems in the theory of computational complexity. In 2022, Kocharovsky found the hafnian master theorem that provided the generating function for the analysis of the matrix hafnian conveniently representing all #P-hard computational problems. He suggested an atomic boson sampling as a novel quantum many-body simulator and, based on the above hafnian canonical technique, proved that it can demonstrate quantum advantage of quantum systems over classical computers. Kocharovsky developed an analytical theory of anomalous BEC fluctuations and found a universal structure of the lambda-point in the critical region of BEC for an ideal gas. He also calculated BEC fluctuations outside the critical region for the interacting gas with a homogeneous or inhomogeneous condensate and discussed a challenging problem of their observation that is much deeper than a mean-field level of the many-body statistical physics. In 1988, Kocharovsky suggested a Bragg-Coulomb mechanism of a high-temperature superconductivity.

Kocharovsky proposed a mechanism for particle acceleration through multiple conversions between charged (protons, electrons) to neutral (neutrons, photons) states which could explain the origin of cosmic rays of the ultra-high energies up to 10^{21} eV. He pointed out the inevitable presence and important role of free neutrons in the dynamics and emission of relativistic shock waves and jets in a vicinity of compact astrophysical sources, including a neutrino production in a neutron-proton relativistic wind. He found that a Hawking radiation of primordial black holes is not observable in and above the GeV energy range due to an electromagnetic cascade in an ejected plasma. In 1999, Kocharovsky developed a model of a compact star collapse and a subsequent gamma-ray burst induced by a primordial black hole coming inside the star. He predicted the annihilation cyclotron lines of gamma radiation from a neutron star and developed the theory of the X-ray cyclotron line formation in the atmosphere of a neutron star with due account for a spectral redistribution of photons. He suggested and developed the method of periodic principle components for the analysis of the dynamical spectra of radio pulsars, which makes it possible to investigate the correlation of different emission sources and the structure of the magnetosphere of neutron stars. Kocharovsky found new classes of the current sheets and filaments with a self-consistent magnetic field in collisionless relativistic plasma and studied the features of multiscale current structures, including turbulent ones, in both cosmic and laboratory (laser) plasmas. He described analytically the propagation of the non-linear Alfvén pulse in a chromospheric magnetic tube of variable diameter in the atmosphere of the Sun and showed that the electric field of the pulse can accelerate electrons up to 1 GeV and drive them into the coronal part of the loop.

== Bibliography ==
- Zheleznyakov, V. V., Kocharovskiĭ, V. V., & Kocharovskiĭ, V. V. (1989). Polarization waves and super-radiance in active media. Soviet physics uspekhi, 32(10), 835.
- Derishev, E. V., Kocharovsky, V. V., & Kocharovsky, V. V. (1999). The neutron component in fireballs of gamma-ray bursts: dynamics and observable imprints. The Astrophysical Journal, 521(2), 640.
- Belyanin, A. A., Capasso, F., Kocharovsky, V. V., Kocharovsky, V. V., & Scully, M. O. (2001). Infrared generation in low-dimensional semiconductor heterostructures via quantum coherence. Physical Review A, 63(5), 053803.
- Kocharovsky, V. V., Kocharovsky, V. V., & Scully, M. O. (2000). Condensate statistics in interacting and ideal dilute Bose gases. Physical review letters, 84(11), 2306.
- Derishev, E. V., Aharonian, F. A., Kocharovsky, V. V., & Kocharovsky, V. V. (2003). Particle acceleration through multiple conversions from a charged into a neutral state and back. Physical Review D, 68(4), 043003.
- Tarasov, S. V., Shannon, W.; Kocharovsky, Vl. V., Kocharovsky, V. V. (2022). Multi-qubit bose–einstein condensate trap for atomic boson sampling. Entropy, 24, 1771.
- Garasev, M. A., Nechaev, A. A., Stepanov, A. N., Kocharovsky, Vl. V. (2022). Multiscale magnetic field structures in an expanding elongated plasma cloud with hot electrons subject to an external magnetic field. Journal of Plasma Physics, 88, 175880301.
- Nechaev, A. A., Kuznetsov, A. A., Kocharovsky, Vl. V. (2023). On the analytical description of the nonlinear stage of the weibel instability in collisionless anisotropic plasma. Journal of Plasma Physics, 89, 175890601.
