= Samuil Kaplan =

Soviet astrophysicist (1921–1978)

Samuil Aronovich Kaplan (Russian: Самуил Аронович Каплан, 10 October 1921 – 11 June 1978) was a Soviet astrophysicist.

== Biography ==
Samuil Kaplan was born in Roslavl. He took part in World War II, in particular, he participated in Defense of Leningrad. In 1945 he graduated from Leningrad Herzen University as a math teacher. In 1948 he defended his candidate of science (Ph.D.) thesis on the topic "Energy sources and the evolution of white dwarfs". In 1948–1961, he worked at Lviv University (he headed the department of astrophysics at the University Observatory, was a professor at the department of theoretical physics). Since 1961, he worked at the Radiophysical Research Institute in Gorky, since 1966 he has been a professor at Gorky University, until his tragic death in a railway accident in 1978.

== Research ==
The main scientific works are related to theoretical astrophysics. He studied the theory of white dwarfs, in particular, he found the relativistic density limit for them and calculated the cooling of white dwarfs. Kaplan found the radius of the last stable orbit in the Schwarzschild field and obtained a number of significant results in the dynamics of the interstellar medium. He determined the parameters of interstellar turbulence, showed the central role of radiation in the theory of interstellar shock waves and ionization ruptures, and constructed the theory of waves with illumination. He studied the theory of turbulence in the magnetic field and the propagation of fast particles in interstellar magnetic fields.

A minor planet 1987 Kaplan was named after Samuil Kaplan.

== External links and further reading ==
- "About Samuil Aronovich Kaplan (1921 - 1978)". Astrophysics and Space Science. 252 (1): 19–21. 1997. Bibcode:1997Ap&SS.252...19.. doi:10.1023/A:1017189410482. S2CID 189840281.
