= 1987 Kaplan =

Stony main-belt asteroid

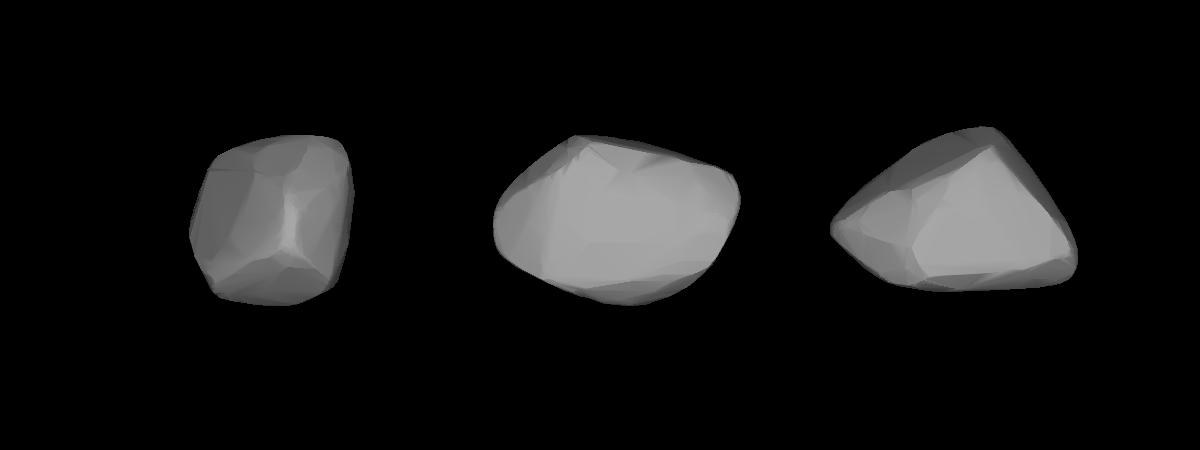
- Lightcurve-based 3D-model of Kaplan

Discovery
- Discovered by: P. F. Shajn
- Discovery site: Simeiz Obs.
- Discovery date: 11 September 1952

Designations
- Named after: Samuil Kaplan (Soviet astrophysicist)
- Alternative designations: 1952 RH
- Minor planet category: main-belt · (inner); Phocaea

Orbital characteristics
- Epoch 4 September 2017 (JD 2458000.5)
- Uncertainty parameter 0
- Observation arc: 64.54 yr (23,573 days)
- Aphelion: 2.9234 AU
- Perihelion: 1.8422 AU
- Semi-major axis: 2.3828 AU
- Eccentricity: 0.2269
- Orbital period (sidereal): 3.68 yr (1,343 days)
- Mean anomaly: 238.97°
- Mean motion: 0° 16^{m} 4.8^{s} / day
- Inclination: 23.645°
- Longitude of ascending node: 314.23°
- Argument of perihelion: 38.176°

Physical characteristics
- Dimensions: 11.70±2.27 km 13.017±0.159 km 13.52±0.39 km 13.89 km (calculated); 14.606±0.104 km
- Synodic rotation period: 9.453±0.002 h (Note: Lightcurve plot of (1987) Kaplan, Brian Warner at the Palmer Divide Observatory (2011). Rotation period 9.453±0.002 hours with a brightness amplitude of 0.65±0.02 mag. Quality code of 3. Summary figures at the LCDB.); 9.45950±0.00005 h 9.46±0.01 h (Note: Lightcurve plot of (1987) Kaplan, Brian Warner at the Palmer Divide Observatory (2000). Rotation period 9.46±0.01 hours with a brightness amplitude of 0.47±0.01 mag. Quality code of 3. Summary figures at the LCDB.); 9.49±0.02 h
- Geometric albedo: 0.2094±0.0448; 0.23 (assumed); 0.262±0.053; 0.278±0.017; 0.28±0.12
- Spectral type: S (assumed)
- Absolute magnitude (H): 11.40 · 11.5 · 11.81 · 12.23±1.34

1987 Kaplan, provisional designation 1952 RH, is a stony Phocaea asteroid from the inner regions of the asteroid belt, approximately 14 kilometers in diameter. It was discovered on 11 September 1952, by Soviet astronomer Pelageya Shajn at the Simeiz Observatory on the Crimean peninsula. The asteroid was named after Soviet astrophysicist Samuil Kaplan.

== Orbit and classification ==
Kaplan is a member of the Phocaea family (701), a large family of stony asteroids with nearly two thousand known members.

It orbits the Sun in the inner main belt at a distance of 1.8–2.9 AU once every 3 years and 8 months (1,343 days). Its orbit has an eccentricity of 0.23 and an inclination of 24° with respect to the ecliptic. The body's observation arc begins with its official discovery observation at Simeiz in September 1952.

== Physical characteristics ==
Kaplan is an assumed S-type asteroid, in agreement with the overall spectral type of the Phocaea family.

=== Rotation period ===
Between 2000 and 2011, three rotational lightcurves of Kaplan were obtained from photometric observations by astronomer Brian Warner at his Palmer Divide Observatory in Colorado, United States. Lightcurve analysis gave a well-defined rotation period between 9.453 and 9.49 hours with a brightness amplitude from 0.46 to 0.65 magnitude (U=3/3/3).

=== Poles ===
In addition a modeled lightcurve, using photometric data from various sources, gave a concurring period of 9.45950 hours and determined two spin axis of (356.0°, −58.0°) and (233.0°, −89.0°) in ecliptic coordinates.

=== Diameter and albedo ===
According to the surveys carried out by the Japanese Akari satellite and the NEOWISE mission of NASA's Wide-field Infrared Survey Explorer, Kaplan measures between 11.70 and 14.606 kilometers in diameter and its surface has an albedo between 0.2094 and 0.28.

The Collaborative Asteroid Lightcurve Link assumes an albedo of 0.23 – derived from 25 Phocaea, the family's parent body and namesake, and calculates a diameter of 13.89 kilometers based on an absolute magnitude of 11.5.

== Naming ==
This minor planet was named after Samuil Kaplan (1921–1978), Soviet astronomer and astrophysicist at Lvov University Observatory (067), Ukraine, and at the Radiophysical Research Institute in Nizhny Novgorod (formerly known as Gorky), Russia. His research included a variety of astrophysical fields, such as white dwarfs, interstellar matter, radiative transfer, solar radiation, pulsars and galactic nuclei.

The official naming citation was published by the Minor Planet Center on 1 June 1980 (M.P.C. 5358).
