= Vitaly Kocharovsky =

Russian physicist

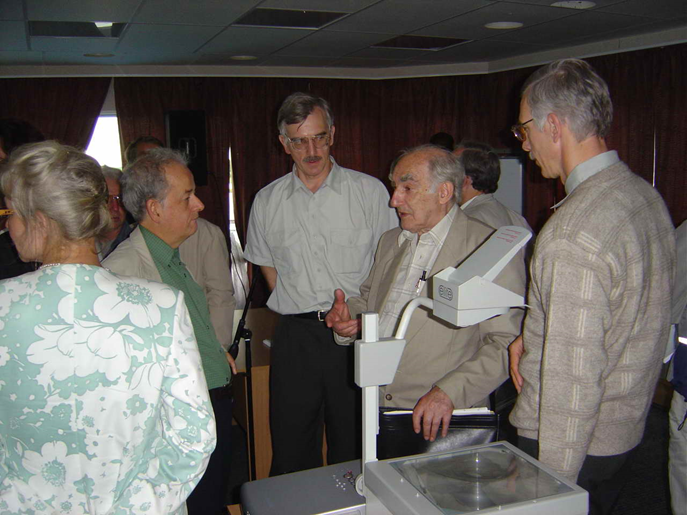
- Born: October 15, 1955 (age 71); Yekaterinburg, Russia
- Occupations: Physicist, academic and researcher
- Relatives: Vladimir Kocharovsky (brother); Olga Kocharovskaya (wife)

Academic background
- Education: M.Sc., Physics and Mathematics; Ph.D., Physics and Mathematics
- Alma mater: N.I. Lobachevsky State University of Nizhny Novgorod; Radiophysical Research Institute, Nizhny Novgorod, Russia

Academic work
- Discipline: Theoretical physics Astrophysics
- Institutions: Texas A&M University; Russian Academy of Sciences

Vitaly Kocharovsky is a Russian-American physicist, academic and researcher. He is a Professor of Physics and Astronomy at Texas A&M University.

Kocharovsky has focused his research on topics in theoretical physics, including quantum gravity, critical phenomena, superradiance, quantum optics, laser physics, semiconductor optoelectronics, wave propagation and mode coupling in inhomogeneous media, magnetospheric physics, plasma astrophysics, gamma- and radio-astronomy, and high-energy cosmic rays.

== Education ==
Kocharovsky received his Master's degree in Physics and Mathematics from N.I. Lobachevsky State University of Nizhny Novgorod, Russia in 1978 and Doctoral Degree in Physics and Mathematics from Radiophysical Research Institute in 1986. He was awarded Dr. of Sciences (Habilitation) Degree in Physics and Mathematics by the Highest Attestation Commission of the Russian Federation in 1998 after completing the habilitation thesis titled "Collective effects of spontaneous emission and quantum theory of dissipative instability".

== Career ==
Kocharovsky started his career as a Researcher at the Institute of Applied Physics of the Russian Academy of Sciences in 1978, and became a Senior Researcher in 1986, and a Leading Researcher in 1996. He held his next appointment at Texas A&M University as an Associate Research Scientist in the Department of Physics in 1998, served as Visiting Associate Professor in 2001, and was promoted to Associate Professor of Physics in 2002, and to Professor of Physics and Astronomy in 2005.

== Research ==
Kocharovsky has focused his research on the theoretical problems in physics and astrophysics, such as negative energy (dissipative) instabilities in quantum gravity, superradince, unification of nature's complexities via a matrix permanent, microscopic theory of critical phenomena in phase transitions, light–matter interaction in quantum optics and laser physics, nonadiabatic mode coupling, plasma astrophysics of neutron stars and black holes, structures and instabilities in a collisionless plasma, mechanisms of particle acceleration and emission, and origin of the ultrahigh-energy cosmic rays.

Kocharovsky found a negative-energy mechanism of instability in the quantum field theory of a gravity-matter system and discussed its manifestation in a cosmological model. He stated that a similar mechanism of a dissipative instability is responsible for a superradiance and predicted new regimes of superradiant lasing and nonequilibrium phase transitions in an atom-light system. In 1997, he predicted a phenomenon of a collective electron-positron annihilation and an electron-hole recombination. The latter phenomenon has been later observed experimentally. Kocharovsky developed also a method of a phenomenological quantum electrodynamics of active media for an analysis of such collective quantum instabilities in nonequilibrium systems.

In 2015, Kocharovsky suggested a microscopic theory of critical phenomena in phase transitions, in particular, for the Ising model of ferromagnetism and Bose-Einstein condensation (BEC). In 2020, he revealed a universality of a matrix permanent for description of major nature's complexities in critical phenomena, quantum information processes in many-body physics, fractal structures and chaos, number theory, and ♯P-hard problems in the theory of computational complexity. Kocharovsky developed an analytical theory of anomalous BEC fluctuations and found a universal structure of the lambda-point in the critical region of BEC for an ideal gas. He also calculated BEC fluctuations outside the critical region for the interacting gas with a homogeneous or inhomogeneous condensate and discussed a challenging problem of their observation that is much deeper than a mean-field level of the many-body statistical physics. In 1988, Kocharovsky suggested a Bragg-Coulomb mechanism of a high-temperature superconductivity.

Kocharovsky proposed a mechanism for particle acceleration through multiple conversions between charged (protons, electrons) to neutral (neutrons, photons) states which could explain the origin of cosmic rays of the ultra-high energies up to 10^{21} eV. He pointed out the inevitable presence and important role of free neutrons in the dynamics and emission of relativistic shock waves and jets in a vicinity of compact astrophysical sources, including a neutrino production in a neutron-proton relativistic wind. He found that a Hawking radiation of primordial black holes is not observable in and above the GeV energy range due to an electromagnetic cascade in an ejected plasma. In 1999, Kocharovsky developed a model of a compact star collapse and a subsequent gamma-ray burst induced by a primordial black hole coming inside the star. He predicted the annihilation cyclotron lines of gamma radiation from a neutron star and developed the theory of the X-ray cyclotron line formation in the atmosphere of a neutron star with due account for a spectral redistribution of photons. Kocharovsky found new classes of the current sheets and filaments with a self-consistent magnetic field in collisionless relativistic plasma and studied the features of multiscale current structures, including turbulent ones, in both cosmic and laboratory plasmas.

== Bibliography ==
- Zheleznyakov, V. V., Kocharovskiĭ, V. V., & Kocharovskiĭ, V. V. (1989). Polarization waves and super-radiance in active media. Soviet physics uspekhi, 32(10), 835.
- Derishev, E. V., Kocharovsky, V. V., & Kocharovsky, V. V. (1999). The neutron component in fireballs of gamma-ray bursts: dynamics and observable imprints. The Astrophysical Journal, 521(2), 640.
- Belyanin, A. A., Capasso, F., Kocharovsky, V. V., Kocharovsky, V. V., & Scully, M. O. (2001). Infrared generation in low-dimensional semiconductor heterostructures via quantum coherence. Physical Review A, 63(5), 053803.
- Kocharovsky, V. V., Kocharovsky, V. V., & Scully, M. O. (2000). Condensate statistics in interacting and ideal dilute Bose gases. Physical review letters, 84(11), 2306.
- Derishev, E. V., Aharonian, F. A., Kocharovsky, V. V., & Kocharovsky, V. V. (2003). Particle acceleration through multiple conversions from a charged into a neutral state and back. Physical Review D, 68(4), 043003.
