= Central-force problem =

There are several types of central-force problems, depending on the physical theory being applied.

== Classical physics ==
- Classical central-force problem
- Kepler problem, a special case (inverse-square central force)
- Two-body problem, which may be reduced to a central-force problem

== General relativity ==
- Schwarzschild solution, the geodesics of the Schwarzschild metric

== Quantum mechanics ==
- Hydrogen-like atom, a special case (inverse-square central force)
