= Radiophysics and Quantum Electronics =

- Discipline: Radiophysics, quantum electronics
- Language: English
- Edited by: Vladimir V. Kocharovsky

Publication details
- History: 1958-present
- Publisher: Springer Science+Business Media
- Frequency: Monthly
- Impact factor: 0.8 (2025)

Standard abbreviations
- ISO 4: Radiophys. Quantum Electron.

Indexing
- CODEN: RPQEAC
- ISSN: 0033-8443 (print); 1573-9120 (web)
- LCCN: 75643512
- OCLC no.: 47189961

Links
- Journal homepage; Online archive

Radiophysics and Quantum Electronics is a monthly peer-reviewed scientific journal covering all aspects of radiophysics and quantum electronics. It is the English translation of the Russian journal IIzvestiya VUZ. Radiofizika. It is published by Springer Science+Business Media on behalf of the Radiophysical Research Institute (Russian Ministry of Education and Science) and the N. I. Lobachevsky State University of Nizhny Novgorod. The journal was established in 1958 and the editor-in-chief is Vladimir V. Kocharovsky.

== Abstracting and indexing ==
The journal is abstracted and indexed in:

- EBSCO databases
- Ei Compendex
- Inspec
- ProQuest databases
- Science Citation Index Expanded
- Scopus

According to the Journal Citation Reports, the journal has a 2025 impact factor of 0.8.
