= Impact parameter =

Distance between a projectile path and center of a potential field affecting it

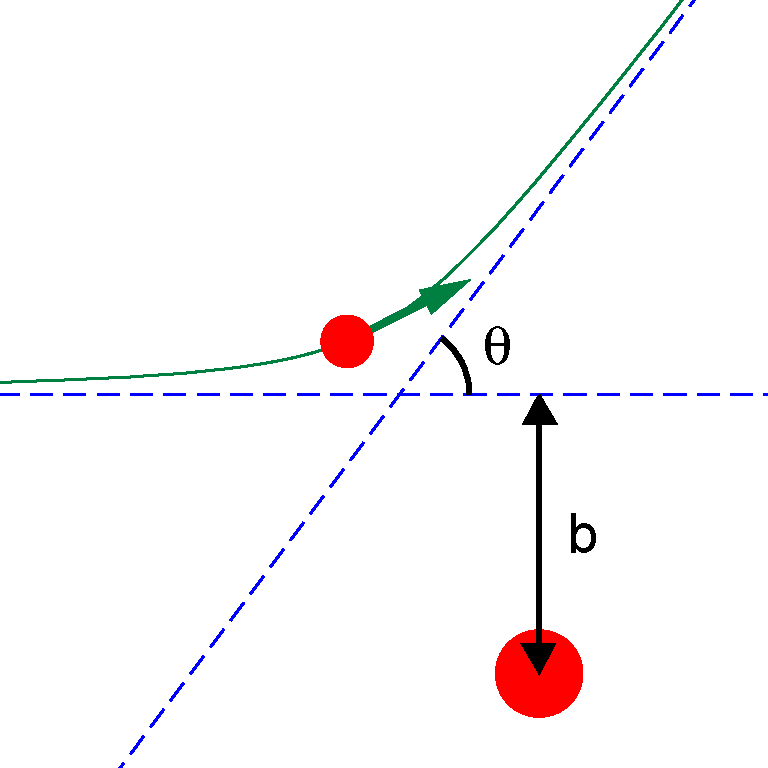
Impact parameter b and scattering angle θ

In physics, the impact parameter b is defined as the perpendicular distance between the path of a projectile and the center of a potential field U(r) created by an object that the projectile is approaching (see diagram). It is often referred to in nuclear physics (see Rutherford scattering) and in classical mechanics.

The impact parameter is related to the scattering angle θ by

$$\theta = \pi - 2b\int_{r_\text{min}}^\infty \frac{dr}{r^2\sqrt{1 - (b/r)^2 - 2U/(mv_\infty^2)}},$$

where v_{∞} is the velocity of the projectile when it is far from the center, and r_{min} is its closest distance from the center.

== Scattering from a hard sphere ==
The simplest example illustrating the use of the impact parameter is in the case of scattering from a sphere. Here, the object that the projectile is approaching is a hard sphere with radius $R$. In the case of a hard sphere, $U(r) = 0$ when $r > R$, and $U(r) = \infty$ for $r \leq R$. When $b > R$, the projectile misses the hard sphere. We immediately see that $\theta = 0$. When $b \leq R$, we find that $b = R \cos\tfrac{\theta}{2}.$

== Collision centrality ==
In high-energy nuclear physics — specifically, in colliding-beam experiments — collisions may be classified according to their impact parameter. Central collisions have $b \approx 0$, peripheral collisions have $0 < b < 2R$, and ultraperipheral collisions (UPCs) have $b > 2R$, where the colliding nuclei are viewed as hard spheres with radius $R$.

Because the color force has an extremely short range, it cannot couple quarks that are separated by much more than one nucleon's radius; hence, strong interactions are suppressed in peripheral and ultraperipheral collisions. This means that final-state particle multiplicity (the total number of particles resulting from the collision), is typically greatest in the most central collisions, due to the partons involved having the greatest probability of interacting in some way. This has led to charged particle multiplicity being used as a common measure of collision centrality, as charged particles are much easier to detect than uncharged particles.

Because strong interactions are effectively impossible in ultraperipheral collisions, they may be used to study electromagnetic interactions — i.e. photon–photon, photon–nucleon, or photon–nucleus interactions — with low background contamination. Because UPCs typically produce only two to four final-state particles, they are also relatively "clean" when compared to central collisions, which may produce hundreds of particles per event.

== See also ==
- Distance of closest approach
- Hyperbolic trajectory § Impact parameter
- Schwarzschild geodesics § Bending of light by gravity
- Tests of general relativity
