= Radiophysical Research Institute =

Engineering research institute

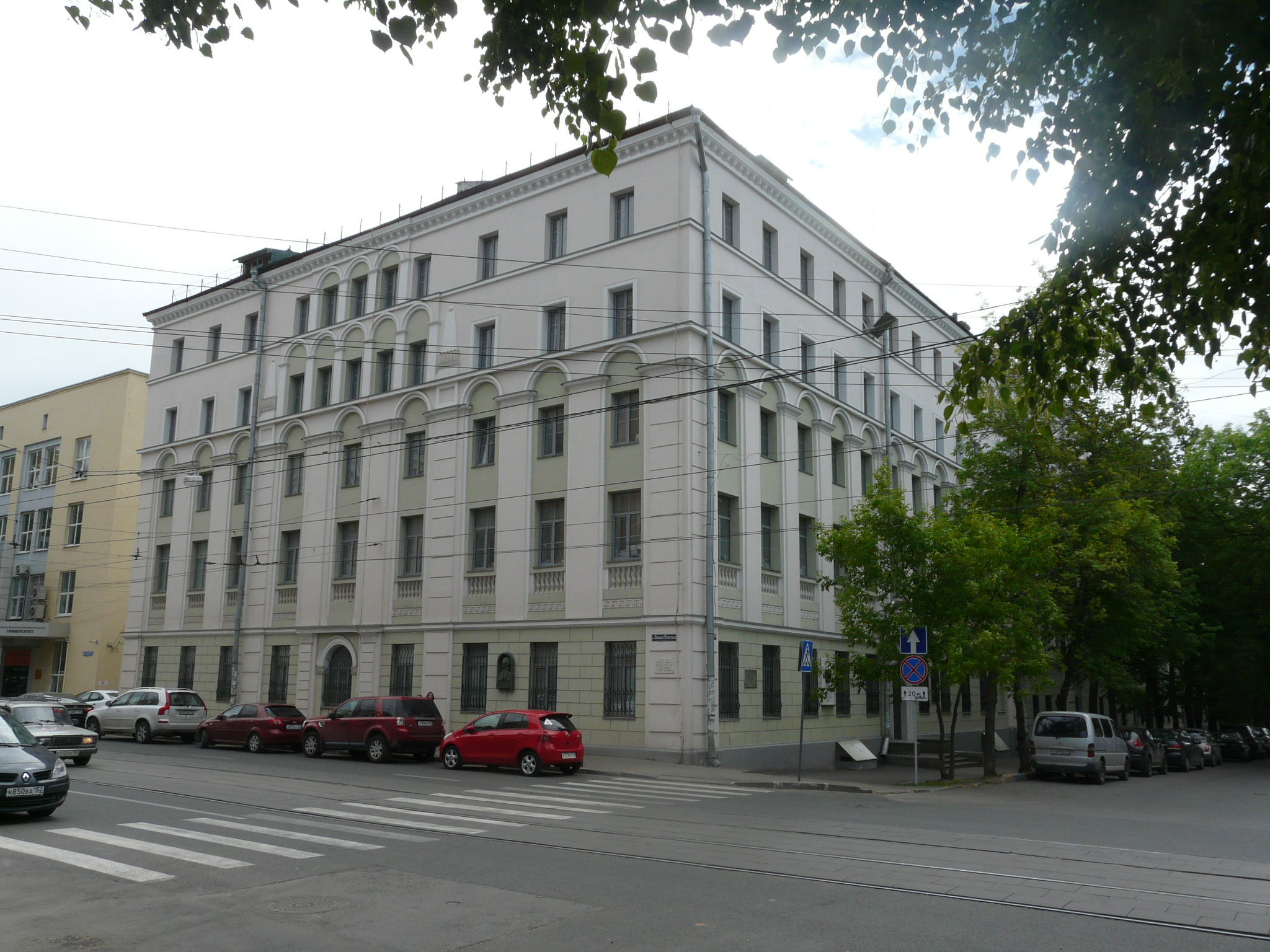
- Established: 1956
- Affiliations: Russian Academy of Sciences
- Location: Miusskaya pl., 4, 125047, Nizhny Novgorod, Russia; 56.32521°N 44.02117°E
- Website: www.keldysh.ru

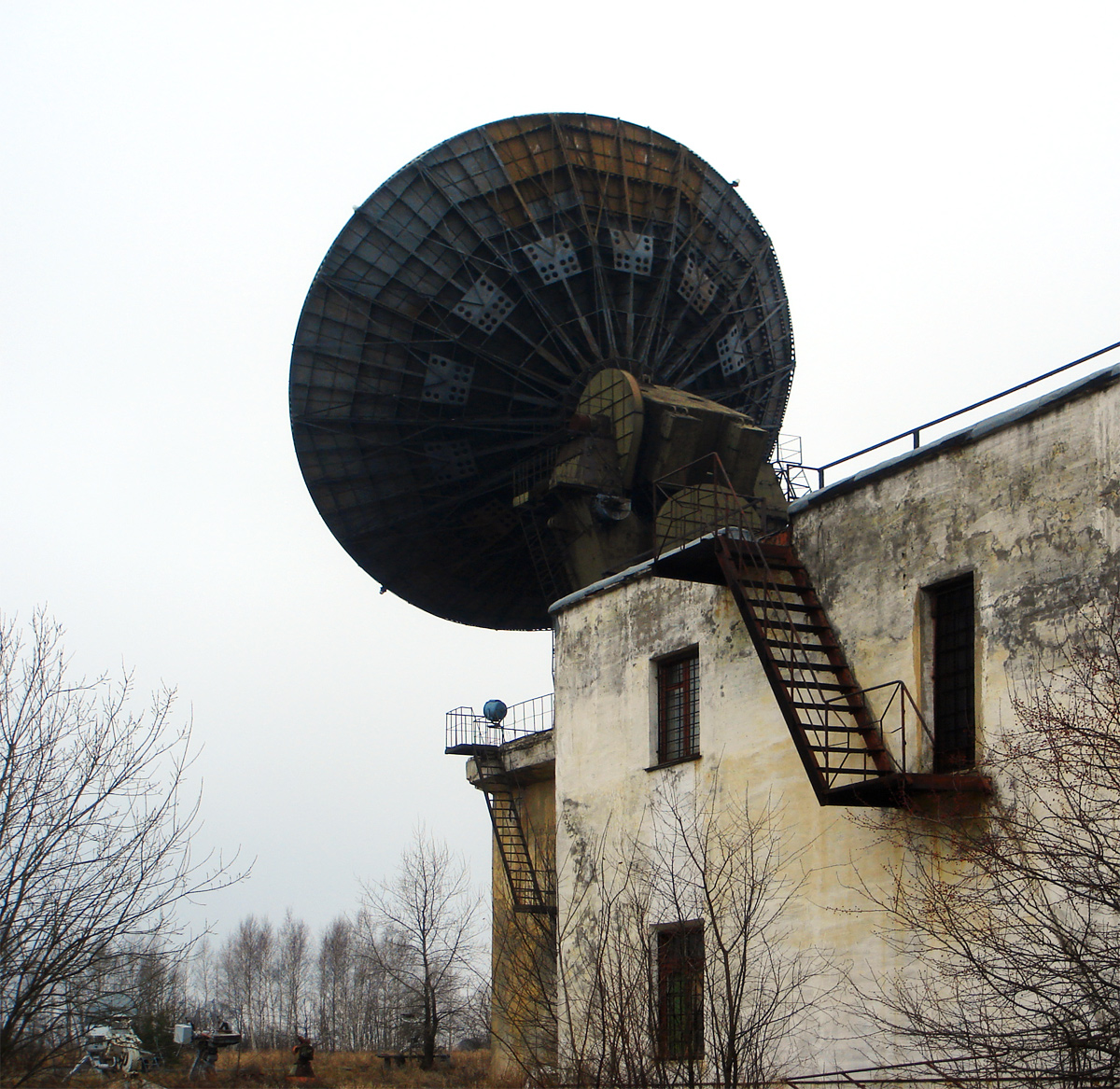
Radio telescope RT-15-2 of radio-astronomical station «Zimenki»

The Radiophysical Research Institute (NIRFI), based in Nizhny Novgorod, Russia, is a research institute that conducts basic and applied research in the field of radiophysics, radio astronomy, cosmology and radio engineering. It is also known for its work in solar physics, sun-earth physics as well as the related geophysics. It also does outreach for the Russian education system. It was formed in 1956 as the Radiophysical Research Institute of the (Soviet) Ministry of Education and Science.

== Projects NIRFI ==
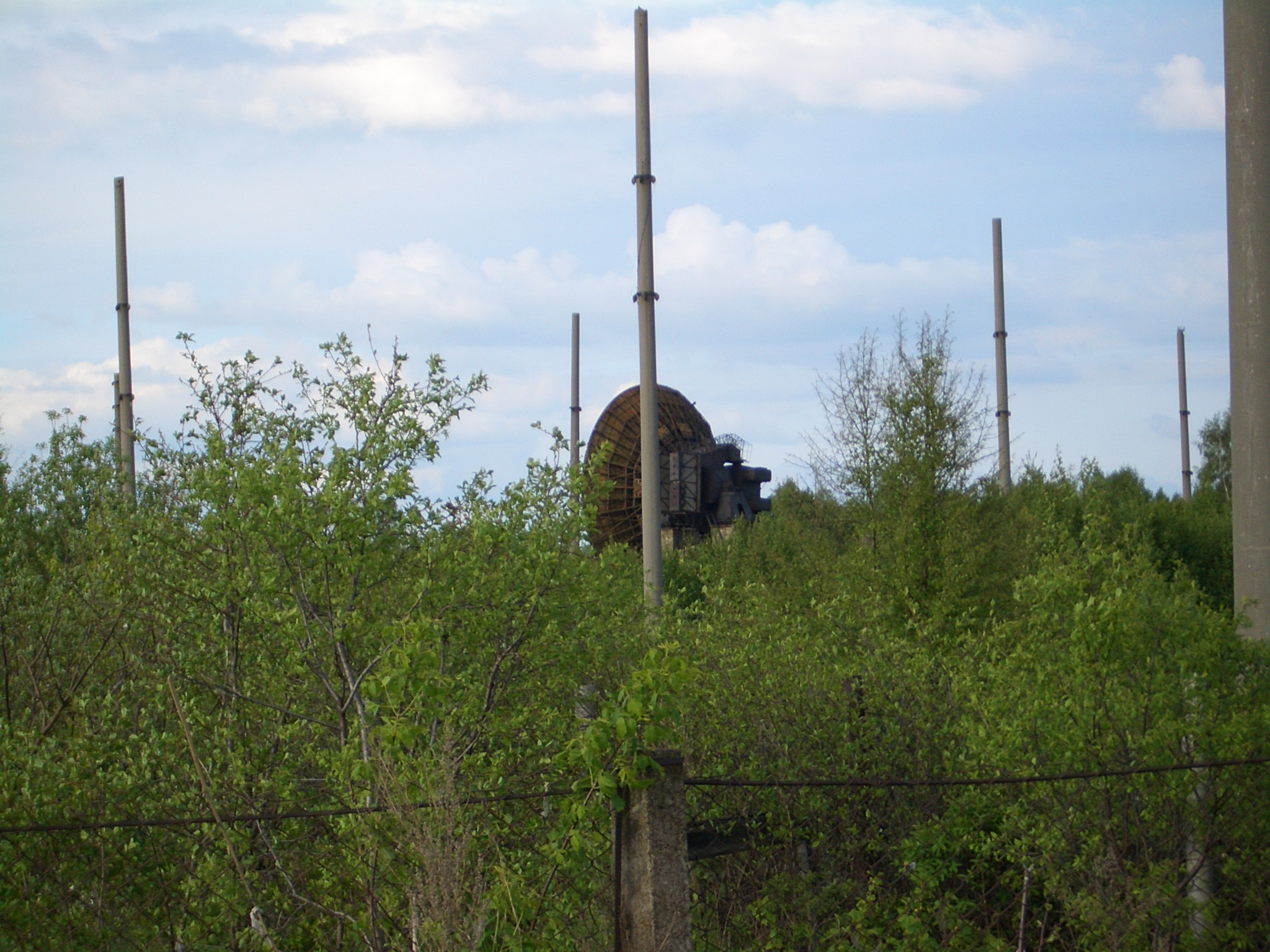
Radiotelescope RT-15-1 astronomical station «Zimenki» NIRFI (May, 2006). Now it is dismantled (it is most likely handed over on scrap metal)

- Sura Ionospheric Heating Facility
- Zimenkovsky radio-astronomical observatory
- Radio telescope - RT-14 laboratories NIRFI Staraya Pustin + two RT-7
