= 1424 Sundmania =

Large asteroid and rather slow rotator

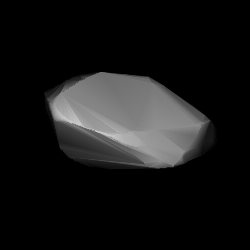
- Shape model of Sundmania from its lightcurve

Discovery
- Discovered by: Y. Väisälä
- Discovery site: Turku Obs.
- Discovery date: 9 January 1937

Designations
- Named after: Karl F. Sundman (Finnish mathematician)
- Alternative designations: 1937 AJ · 1929 SS; 1929 UB · 1931 AD; 1938 FP · A918 WA
- Minor planet category: main-belt · (outer)

Orbital characteristics
- Epoch 4 September 2017 (JD 2458000.5)
- Uncertainty parameter 0
- Observation arc: 98.53 yr (35,989 days)
- Aphelion: 3.3831 AU
- Perihelion: 2.9966 AU
- Semi-major axis: 3.1899 AU
- Eccentricity: 0.0606
- Orbital period (sidereal): 5.70 yr (2,081 days)
- Mean anomaly: 196.29°
- Mean motion: 0° 10^{m} 22.8^{s} / day
- Inclination: 9.1784°
- Longitude of ascending node: 42.988°
- Argument of perihelion: 301.53°

Physical characteristics
- Mean diameter: 64.691±0.254 km 68.169±1.767 km 70.56 km (derived); 70.75±2.5 km 73.40±0.86 km 74.46±16.37 km 80.20±28.15 km 84.67±0.64 km
- Synodic rotation period: 93.73±0.03 h
- Pole ecliptic latitude: (51.0°, 76.0°) (λ_{1}/β_{1}); (275.0°, 58.0°) (λ_{2}/β_{2})
- Geometric albedo: 0.030±0.004; 0.03±0.01; 0.03±0.04; 0.0426 (derived); 0.052±0.001; 0.0559±0.004; 0.0602±0.0136
- Spectral type: SMASS = X · P · C
- Absolute magnitude (H): 9.50 · 9.80 · 9.90 · 10.03±0.38 · 10.07

1424 Sundmania (prov. designation: 1937 AJ) is a large asteroid and rather slow rotator from the background population of the outer regions of the asteroid belt. It was discovered on 9 January 1937, by astronomer Yrjö Väisälä at the Turku Observatory in southwest Finland. The dark X-type asteroid has a notably long rotation period of 93.7 hours and measures approximately 70 kilometers (43 miles) in diameter. It was named after Finnish astronomer and mathematician Karl F. Sundman.

== Orbit and classification ==
Sundmania is a non-family asteroid of the main belt's background population when applying the hierarchical clustering method to its proper orbital elements. It orbits the Sun in the outer main-belt at a distance of 3.0–3.4 AU once every 5 years and 8 months (2,081 days). Its orbit has an eccentricity of 0.06 and an inclination of 9° with respect to the ecliptic. The body's observation arc begins with its first identification as A918 WA at Heidelberg Observatory in November 1918, more than 18 years prior to its official discovery observation at Turku.

== Naming ==
This minor planet was named after Finnish mathematician Karl F. Sundman (1873–1949), who intensively worked on the n-body problem. Sundman worked as an astronomer at several observatories all over Europe. He became director of the Helsinki University Observatory and was appointed professor of astronomy at the University of Helsinki in 1907. The asteroids 1558 Järnefelt and 1559 Kustaanheimo were also named after astronomers from the University of Helsinki. The naming was mentioned in The Names of the Minor Planets by Paul Herget in 1955 (H 129). The lunar crater Sundman was also named in his honor.

== Physical characteristics ==
In the SMASS classification, Sundmania is an X-type asteroid. It has also been characterized as a primitive P-type by the Wide-field Infrared Survey Explorer (WISE). The Lightcurve Data Base assumes it to be a carbonaceous C-type asteroid.

=== Rotation period ===
Sundmania is a rather slow rotator as most minor planets have a rotation period of less than 20 hours.

In April 2012, a rotational lightcurve of Sundmania was obtained from photometric observations by American astronomer Robert Stephens at the Goat Mountain Astronomical Research Station (G79) in California. Lightcurve analysis gave a rotation period of 93.73 hours with a brightness amplitude of 0.42 magnitude (U=2+). Observations by French amateur astronomers Laurent Bernasconi and René Roy gave a period of 36 and 47 hours, of which the latter seems to be half the period solution obtained by Stephens (U=1/1+).

=== Spin axis ===
In 2016, an international study modeled a lightcurve with a period of 94.537±0.005 hours and found two spin axes of (51.0°, 76.0°) and (275.0°, 58.0°) in ecliptic coordinates (λ, β).

=== Diameter and albedo ===
According to the surveys carried out by the Infrared Astronomical Satellite IRAS, the Japanese Akari satellite and the NEOWISE mission of NASA's WISE telescope, Sundmania measures between 64.691 and 84.67 kilometers in diameter and its surface has an albedo between 0.030 and 0.0602. The Collaborative Asteroid Lightcurve Link derives an albedo of 0.0426 and a diameter of 70.56 kilometers based on an absolute magnitude of 9.8.
