= Q. Wang =

Q. Wang may refer to:

- Qiudong Wang, professor of mathematics
- Q. Wang (artist) (born 1962), Chinese-American primitivist painter
