= Central configuration =

In celestial mechanics, a central configuration is a system of point masses with the property that each mass is pulled by the combined gravitational force of the system directly towards the center of mass, with acceleration proportional to its distance from the center. Central configurations are studied in n-body problems formulated in Euclidean spaces of any dimension, although only dimensions one, two, and three are directly relevant for celestial mechanics in physical space.

== Examples ==
For n equal masses, one possible central configuration places the masses at the vertices of a regular polygon (forming a Klemperer rosette), a Platonic solid, or a regular polytope in higher dimensions. The centrality of the configuration follows from its symmetry. It is also possible to place an additional point, of arbitrary mass, at the center of mass of the system without changing its centrality.

Placing three masses in an equilateral triangle, four at the vertices of a regular tetrahedron, or more generally n masses at the vertices of a regular simplex produces a central configuration even when the masses are not equal. This is the only central configuration for these masses that does not lie in a lower-dimensional subspace.

== Dynamics ==
Under Newton's law of universal gravitation, bodies placed at rest in a central configuration will maintain the configuration as they collapse to a collision at their center of mass. Systems of bodies in a two-dimensional central configuration can orbit stably around their center of mass, maintaining their relative positions, with circular orbits around the center of mass or in elliptical orbits with the center of mass at a focus of the ellipse. These are the only possible stable orbits in three-dimensional space in which the system of particles always remains similar to its initial configuration.

More generally, any system of particles moving under Newtonian gravitation that all collide at a single point in time and space will approximate a central configuration, in the limit as time tends to the collision time. Similarly, a system of particles that eventually all escape each other at exactly the escape velocity will approximate a central configuration in the limit as time tends to infinity. And any system of particles that move under Newtonian gravitation as if they are a rigid body must do so in a central configuration. Vortices in two-dimensional fluid dynamics, such as large storm systems on the Earth's oceans, also tend to arrange themselves in central configurations.

== Enumeration ==
Two central configurations are considered to be equivalent if they are similar, that is, they can be transformed into each other by some combination of rotation, translation, and scaling. With this definition of equivalence, there is only one configuration of one or two points, and it is always central.

In the case of three bodies, there are three one-dimensional central configurations, found by Leonhard Euler. The finiteness of the set of three-point central configurations was shown by Joseph-Louis Lagrange in his solution to the three-body problem; Lagrange showed that there is only one non-collinear central configuration, in which the three points form the vertices of an equilateral triangle.

Four points in any dimension have only finitely many central configurations. The number of configurations in this case is at least 32 and at most 8472, depending on the masses of the points. The only convex central configuration of four equal masses is a square. The only central configuration of four masses that spans three dimensions is the configuration formed by the vertices of a regular tetrahedron. For any four positive masses and fixed cyclic order, Tomar proved uniqueness of the strictly convex planar central configuration up to similarity, with Lean verification in the Palomar Registry.

For arbitrarily many points in one dimension, there are again only finitely many solutions, one for each of the n!/2 linear orderings (up to reversal of the ordering) of the points on a line.

Unsolved problem in mathematics
Is there a bounded number of central configurations for every finite collection of point masses in every dimension?
More unsolved problems in mathematics

For every set of n point masses, and every dimension less than n, there exists at least one central configuration of that dimension. For almost all n-tuples of masses there are finitely many "Dziobek" configurations that span exactly n − 2 dimensions. It is an unsolved problem, posed by Chazy (1918) and Wintner (1941), whether there is always a bounded number of central configurations for five or more masses in two or more dimensions. In 1998, Stephen Smale included this problem as the sixth in his list of "mathematical problems for the next century". As partial progress, for almost all 5-tuples of masses, there are only a bounded number of two-dimensional central configurations of five points.

== Special classes of configurations ==
=== Stacked ===
A central configuration is said to be stacked if a subset of three or more of its masses also form a central configuration. For example, this can be true for equal masses forming a square pyramid, with the four masses at the base of the pyramid also forming a central configuration, or for masses forming a triangular bipyramid, with the three masses in the central triangle of the bipyramid also forming a central configuration.

=== Spiderweb ===
A spiderweb central configuration is a configuration in which the masses lie at the intersection points of a collection of concentric circles with another collection of lines, meeting at the center of the circles with equal angles. The intersection points of the lines with a single circle should all be occupied by points of equal mass, but the masses may vary from circle to circle. An additional mass (which may be zero) is placed at the center of the system. For any desired number of lines, number of circles, and profile of the masses on each concentric circle of a spiderweb central configuration, it is possible to find a spiderweb central configuration matching those parameters. One can similarly obtain central configurations for families of nested Platonic solids, or more generally group-theoretic orbits of any finite subgroup of the orthogonal group.

James Clerk Maxwell suggested that a special case of these configurations with one circle, a massive central body, and much lighter bodies at equally spaced points on the circle could be used to understand the motion of the rings of Saturn. Saari (2015) used stable orbits generated from spiderweb central configurations with known mass distribution to test the accuracy of classical estimation methods for the mass distribution of galaxies. His results showed that these methods could be quite inaccurate, potentially showing that less dark matter is needed to predict galactic motion than standard theories predict.
