= Orbiting body =

Physical bodies that orbits the primary bodies

In astrodynamics, an orbiting body is any physical body that orbits a more massive one, called the primary body. The orbiting body is properly referred to as the secondary body ($m_2$), which is less massive than the primary body ($m_1$).

Thus, $m_2 < m_1$ or $m_1 > m_2$.

Under standard assumptions in astrodynamics, the barycenter of the two bodies is a focus of both orbits.

An orbiting body may be a spacecraft (i.e. an artificial satellite) or a natural satellite, such as a planet, dwarf planet, moon, moonlet, asteroid, or comet.

A system of two orbiting bodies is modeled by the Two-Body Problem and a system of three orbiting bodies is modeled by the Three-Body Problem. These problems can be generalized to an N-body problem. While there are a few analytical solutions to the n-body problem, it can be reduced to a 2-body system if the secondary body stays out of other bodies' Sphere of Influence and remains in the primary body's sphere of influence.

== See also ==
- Barycenter
- Double planet
- Primary (astronomy)
- Satellite
- Two-body problem
- Three-body problem
- N-body problem
