= Celestial mechanics =

Branch of astronomy

Celestial mechanics is a branch of classical mechanics that deals with the motion and gravitational interactions of astronomical objects. Historically, celestial mechanics applied Newton's laws of motion to astronomical objects, such as stars and planets, to produce ephemeris data. The computation of the motion of the bodies through orbital mechanics can be simplified by using an appropriate inertial frame of reference. This leads to the use of various different coordinate systems, such as the Heliocentric (Sun-centered) coordinate system.

In a binary system of objects interacting through gravity, Newtonian mechanics can be used to produce a set of orbital elements that will predict with reasonable accuracy the future position of the two bodies. This method demonstrates the correctness of Kepler's laws of planetary motion. Where one of the bodies is sufficiently massive, general relativity must be included to predict apsidal precession. The problem becomes more complicated when another body is added, creating a three-body problem that cannot be solved exactly. Perturbation theory is used to find an approximate solution to this problem.

== History ==
Modern analytic celestial mechanics started with Isaac Newton's Principia (1687). The name celestial mechanics is more recent than that. Newton wrote that the field should be called "rational mechanics". The term "dynamics" came in a little later with Gottfried Leibniz, and over a century after Newton, Pierre-Simon Laplace introduced the term celestial mechanics. Prior to Kepler, there was little connection between exact, quantitative prediction of planetary positions, using geometrical or numerical techniques, and contemporary discussions of the physical causes of the planets' motion.

=== Laws of planetary motion ===
Johannes Kepler was the first to closely integrate the predictive geometrical astronomy, which had been dominant from Ptolemy in the 2nd century to Copernicus, with physical concepts to produce a New Astronomy, Based upon Causes, or Celestial Physics in 1609. His work led to the laws of planetary orbits, which he developed using his physical principles and the planetary observations made by Tycho Brahe. Kepler's elliptical model greatly improved the accuracy of predictions of planetary motion, years before Newton developed his law of gravitation in 1686.

=== Newtonian mechanics and universal gravitation ===
Isaac Newton is credited with introducing the idea that the motion of objects in the heavens, such as planets, the Sun, and the Moon, and the motion of objects on the ground, like cannon balls and falling apples, could be described by the same set of physical laws. In this sense he unified celestial and terrestrial dynamics. Using his law of gravity, Newton confirmed Kepler's laws for elliptical orbits by deriving them from the gravitational two-body problem, which Newton included in his epochal Philosophiæ Naturalis Principia Mathematica in 1687.

=== Three-body problem ===
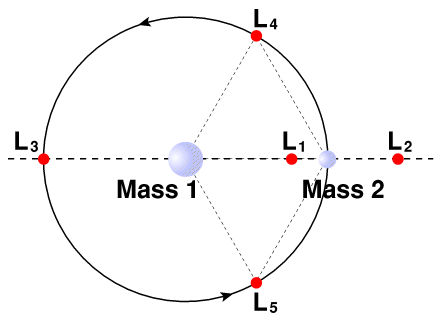
The five Lagrange points for a circular orbit

Following Newton, mathematicians attempted to solve the more complex problem of predicting the future motion of three bodies interacting through gravity: the three-body problem. The first to provide a periodic solution was the Swiss mathematician Leonhard Euler, who in 1762 demonstrated three equilibrium points lie along a straight line passing through the two primary masses. If a body of infinitesimal mass occupied one of these points, it would remain there in a stable orbit. French mathematician Joseph-Louis Lagrange attempted to solve this restricted three-body problem in 1772, and discovered two more stable orbits at the vertices of equilateral triangles with the two primary masses. Collectively, these solutions became known as the Lagrange points.

Lagrange reformulated the principles of classical mechanics, emphasizing energy more than force, and developing a method to use a single polar coordinate equation to describe any orbit, even those that are parabolic and hyperbolic. This is useful for calculating the behaviour of planets and comets and such (parabolic and hyperbolic orbits are conic section extensions of Kepler's elliptical orbits). More recently, it has also become useful to calculate spacecraft trajectories.

Henri Poincaré published two now classical monographs, "New Methods of Celestial Mechanics" (1892–1899) and "Lectures on Celestial Mechanics" (1905–1910). In them, he successfully applied the results of their research to the problem of the motion of three bodies and studied in detail the behavior of solutions (frequency, stability, asymptotic, and so on). Poincaré showed that the three-body problem is not integrable. In other words, the general solution of the three-body problem cannot be expressed in terms of algebraic and transcendental functions through unambiguous coordinates and velocities of the bodies. His work in this area was the first major achievement in celestial mechanics since Isaac Newton's Principia.

These monographs include an idea of Poincaré, which later became the basis for mathematical "chaos theory" (see, in particular, the Poincaré recurrence theorem) and the general theory of dynamical systems. He introduced the important concept of bifurcation points and proved the existence of equilibrium figures such as the non-ellipsoids, including ring-shaped and pear-shaped figures, and their stability. For this discovery, Poincaré received the Gold Medal of the Royal Astronomical Society (1900).

=== Standardisation of astronomical tables ===
Simon Newcomb was a Canadian-American astronomer who revised Peter Andreas Hansen's table of lunar positions. In 1877, assisted by George William Hill, he recalculated all the major astronomical constants. After 1884 he conceived, with A. M. W. Downing, a plan to resolve much international confusion on the subject. By the time he attended a standardisation conference in Paris, France, in May 1886, the international consensus was that all ephemerides should be based on Newcomb's calculations. A further conference as late as 1950 confirmed Newcomb's constants as the international standard.

=== Anomalous precession of Mercury ===
Apsidal precession of Mercury's orbit around the Sun (not to scale)

In 1849, Urbain Le Verrier reported that Mercury's closest approach the Sun, its perihelion, was observed to advance at the rate of 43″ per century. This precession of Mercury's perihelion could not be accounted for by known gravitational perturbations using Newton's law. Instead, Le Verrier later attributed the effect to a proposed planet orbiting inside the orbit of Mercury. Dubbed Vulcan, subsequent searches failed to locate any such body. The cause remained a mystery until Albert Einstein explained the apsidal precession in his 1916 paper The Foundation of the General Theory of Relativity. General relativity led astronomers to recognize that Newtonian mechanics did not provide the highest accuracy in proximity to massive bodies. This led to attempts to solve the two-body problem in general relativity and the discovery of gravitational radiation.

== Examples of problems ==
Celestial motion, without additional forces such as drag forces or the thrust of a rocket, is governed by the reciprocal gravitational acceleration between masses. A generalization is the n-body problem, where a number n of masses are mutually interacting via the gravitational force. Although analytically not integrable in the general case, the integration can be well approximated numerically.

Examples:
- 4-body problem: spaceflight to Mars (for parts of the flight the influence of one or two bodies is very small, so that there we have a 2- or 3-body problem; see also the patched conic approximation)
- 3-body problem:
  - Quasi-satellite
  - Spaceflight to, and stay at a Lagrangian point

In the $n=2$ case (two-body problem) the configuration is much simpler than for $n>2$. In this case, the system is fully integrable and exact solutions can be found.

Examples:
- A binary star, e.g., Alpha Centauri (approx. the same mass)
- A binary asteroid, e.g., 90 Antiope (approx. the same mass)

A further simplification is based on the "standard assumptions in astrodynamics", which include that one body, the orbiting body, is much smaller than the other, the central body. This is also often approximately valid.

Examples:
- The Solar System orbiting the center of the Milky Way
- A planet orbiting the Sun
- A moon orbiting a planet
- A spacecraft orbiting Earth, a moon, or a planet (in the latter cases the approximation only applies after arrival at that orbit)

== Perturbation theory ==
Perturbation theory comprises mathematical methods that are used to find an approximate solution to a problem which cannot be solved exactly. (It is closely related to the "guess, check, and adjust" method used in numerical analysis, which is ancient.) The earliest use of modern perturbation theory was to deal with the otherwise unsolvable mathematical problems of celestial mechanics: Newton's solution for the orbit of the Moon, which moves noticeably differently from a simple Keplerian ellipse because of the competing gravitation of the Earth and the Sun. Additional sources of orbital perturbation include atmospheric drag, solar radiation pressure, and non-uniform gravitational fields.

Perturbation methods start with a simplified form of the original problem, which is chosen to be exactly solvable. In celestial mechanics, this is usually a Keplerian ellipse, which is correct when there are only two gravitating bodies, but is often close enough for practical use. The solved, but simplified problem is then "perturbed" to make its time-rate-of-change equations for the object's position closer to the values from the real problem. The changes that result from the terms in the equations are used as corrections to the original solution. Because simplifications are made at every step, the corrections are never perfect, but even one cycle of corrections often provides a better approximation.

A partially corrected solution can be re-used as the new starting point for another cycle of perturbations and corrections. In principle, the recycling of prior solutions to obtain a better solution could continue indefinitely. The difficulty is that the corrections usually progressively make the new solutions more complicated. Newton is reported to have said, regarding the problem of the Moon's orbit "It causeth my head to ache.".

== Reference frame ==
An inertial frame of reference (brown) mapped from a baseline coordinate system (blue)

A reference frame is an arbitrary defined coordinate system, whose origin, orientation, and scale are specified in physical space. The frame is aligned via a set of reference points, such as distant galaxies. Problems in celestial mechanics are often posed in simplifying reference frames, such as the synodic reference frame applied to the three-body problem, where the origin coincides with the barycenter of the two larger celestial bodies. Other reference frames for n-body simulations include those that place the origin to follow the center of mass of a body, such as the heliocentric and the geocentric reference frames. The choice of reference frame gives rise to phenomena such as the retrograde motion of superior planets in a geocentric reference frame.

An Inertial frame of reference is employed for bodies with mass. Thus a Lunar Reference System defines an Earth Inertial frame with Earth as the origin, the Lunar Inertial frame having an origin of the Moon, and an Earth-Moon Barycentric Rotating frame anchored to the rotating Earth-Moon barycenter. Positioning systems such as GPS or GLONASS use a reference frame based on the Earth. However, these are unsuitable for navigation in space. For interplanetary trajectories, a heliocentric (Sun-centered) coordinate system is used, with the XY plane aligned with the ecliptic as defined for a particular epoch.

The local standard of rest (LSR) is a reference frame based on the mean motion of stellar objects in the neighborhood of the Sun. The peculiar velocity of the Sun relative to this framework is 13.4 km/s in the direction of the solar apex. There are two possible definitions for the LSR: the first is based on the kinetic motion of nearby stars, and the second is a dynamical standard that follows the Sun in its orbit around the galaxy. These two drift apart with the passage of time as the stars follow the gravitational potential around the galaxy. Perturbations in a star's galactic orbit result in epicycle motions.

The cosmic microwave background has its own co-moving frame of reference. The relative motion of the Sun at 365 km/s results in a dipole anisotropy due to redshift of the isotropic radiation from this source.

== Orbital mechanics ==
A satellite orbiting Earth has a tangential velocity and an inward acceleration.

Orbital mechanics , astrodynamics or space dynamics is the application of ballistics and celestial mechanics to rockets, satellites, and other spacecraft. The motion of these objects is usually calculated from laws of motion and of universal gravitation derived by Isaac Newton. Astrodynamics is a core discipline within space-mission design and control.

Celestial mechanics treats more broadly the orbit dynamics of systems under the influence of gravity, including both spacecraft and natural astronomical bodies such as star systems, planets, moons, and comets. Orbital mechanics focuses on spacecraft trajectories, including orbital maneuvers, orbital plane changes, and interplanetary transfers, and is used by mission planners to predict the results of propulsive maneuvers.

General relativity is a more exact theory than Newton's laws for calculating orbits, and it is sometimes necessary to use it for greater accuracy or in high-gravity situations (e.g. orbits near the Sun).

External videos
- Space Flight: The Application of Orbital Mechanics by NASA
- YouTube / NASA STI Program

== See also ==
- Astrometry is a part of astronomy that deals with measuring the positions of stars and other celestial bodies, their distances and movements.
- Celestial navigation is a position fixing technique that was the first system devised to help sailors locate themselves on a featureless ocean.
- Developmental Ephemeris or the Jet Propulsion Laboratory Developmental Ephemeris (JPL DE) is a widely used model of the solar system, which combines celestial mechanics with numerical analysis and astronomical and spacecraft data.
- Dynamics of the celestial spheres concerns pre-Newtonian explanations of the causes of the motions of the stars and planets.
- Dynamical time scale
- Ephemeris is a compilation of positions of naturally occurring astronomical objects as well as artificial satellites in the sky at a given time or times.
- Lunar theory attempts to account for the motions of the Moon.
- Numerical analysis is a branch of mathematics, pioneered by celestial mechanicians, for calculating approximate numerical answers (such as the position of a planet in the sky) which are too difficult to solve down to a general, exact formula.
- Creating a numerical model of the solar system was the original goal of celestial mechanics, and has only been imperfectly achieved. It continues to motivate research.
- Orbital elements are the parameters needed to specify a Newtonian two-body orbit uniquely.
- Osculating orbit is the temporary Keplerian orbit about a central body that an object would continue on, if other perturbations were not present.
- Retrograde motion is orbital motion in a system, such as a planet and its satellites, that is contrary to the direction of rotation of the central body, or more generally contrary in direction to the net angular momentum of the entire system.
- Apparent retrograde motion is the periodic, apparently backwards motion of planetary bodies when viewed from the Earth (an accelerated reference frame).
- Tidal force is the combination of out-of-balance forces and accelerations of (mostly) solid bodies that raises tides in bodies of liquid (oceans), atmospheres, and strains planets' and satellites' crusts.
- Two solutions, called VSOP82 and VSOP87 are versions one mathematical theory for the orbits and positions of the major planets, which seeks to provide accurate positions over an extended period of time.
