= N-body choreography =

Periodic solution to the n-body problem

An n-body choreography is a periodic solution to the n-body problem in which all the bodies are equally spread out along a single orbit. The term was originated in 2000 by Chenciner and Montgomery. One such orbit is a circular orbit, with equal masses at the corners of an equilateral triangle; another is the figure-8 orbit, first discovered numerically in 1993 by Cristopher Moore and subsequently proved to exist by Chenciner and Montgomery. Choreographies can be discovered using variational methods, and more recently, topological approaches have been used to attempt a classification in the planar case. Having knowledge of specific solutions such as choreographies can be incredibly useful as it is not possible to solve the N-body problem for N > 2 through explicit means.

== Numerical Method ==
Numerical methods using computers have been crucial in the discovery and understanding of choreographies from their inception. In 1993, Moore employed a numerical implementation of the direct method from the calculus of variations to uncover the "eight" choreography. Later, during the rediscovery period between 1999 and 2000, Carles Simó dispelled doubts surrounding the validity of complex existence proofs through meticulous numerical investigations.

The numerical implementation process can be distilled into a gradient search within a finite-dimensional approximation of the path space. One approach involves discretizing the path at uniform time intervals. Another effective method entails expressing the action as a function of the Fourier components of the choreography curve and truncating the Fourier series at a finite order. Convergence can be verified by increasing the truncation order and observing the alterations in the resulting minimizing Fourier coefficients. If these changes fall within a specified tolerance range, the result can be considered successful. For further refinements, consult the works of Simó or Moore and Nauenberg.

=== Topological Method ===
In 2013, Montaldi and Steckles categorized all possible symmetry groups of planar 𝑛-body collision-free choreographies, which can be divided into two infinite families and, in the case of odd values of 𝑛, three exceptional groups. The second part of their study involves the development of the equivariant fundamental group, which is employed to identify the topology of the space of loops possessing a particular symmetry. They demonstrate that this topology is linked to certain cosets of the pure braid group in the full braid group, as well as the centralizers of elements within the corresponding coset. Furthermore, their work refines the symmetry classification by categorizing the connected components of the set of loops with a given symmetry, leading to the discovery of many new choreographies in 𝑛-body systems that are governed by a strong force potential.
