= Sundman (crater) =

Lunar surface depression

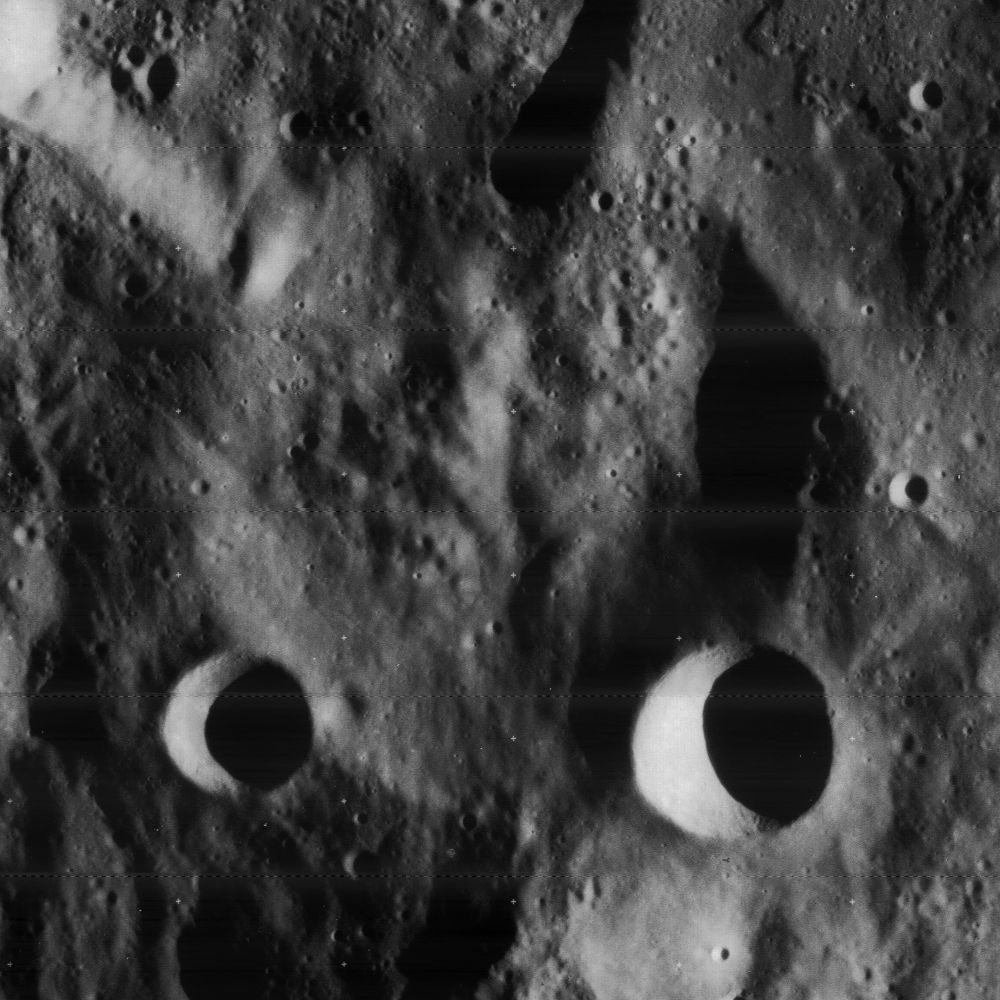
- Lunar Orbiter 4 image
- Coordinates: 10.8°N 91.6°W
- Diameter: 40 km
- Depth: Unknown
- Colongitude: 92° at sunrise
- Eponym: Karl F. Sundman

Sundman is a lunar impact crater that lies just past the western limb of the Moon. Although it lies on the far side from the Earth, this part of the surface is brought into view during periods of favorable libration and illumination. Sundman lies to the southwest of the walled plain named Einstein, and to the west of the Vallis Bohr cleft. It was named after Finnish mathematician and astronomer Karl F. Sundman.

== Description ==
This crater lies in the midst of the skirt of ejecta that surrounds the Mare Orientale impact basin. Both the crater and its surroundings have been modified by this enormous amount of material, and the surface displays an uneven pattern that is generally radial to the basin, which is located to the north. The crater forms a shallow depression in the surface, with small craters along the southeastern and southwestern rim.

== Satellite craters ==
By convention these features are identified on lunar maps by placing the letter on the side of the crater midpoint that is closest to Sundman.

Feature	Latitude	Longitude	Diameter	Ref
Sundman J	8.9° N	90.2° W	10.34 km	WGPSN
Sundman V	11.9° N	93.5° W	17.93 km	WGPSN

Sundman J dates to the Copernican period and has a meteoritic iron-rich impact melt.

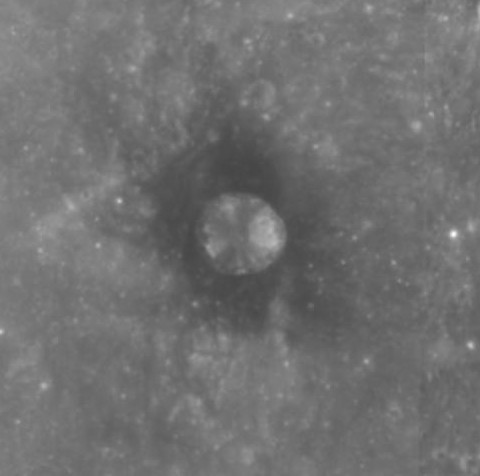
Sundman J is a prominent dark-halo crater

== LADEE impact ==
The Lunar Atmosphere and Dust Environment Explorer (LADEE) mission ended with a planned lunar impact on April 18, 2014. Later, the exact impact location was found to be near the eastern rim of Sundman V crater.

LADEE - Impact Crater

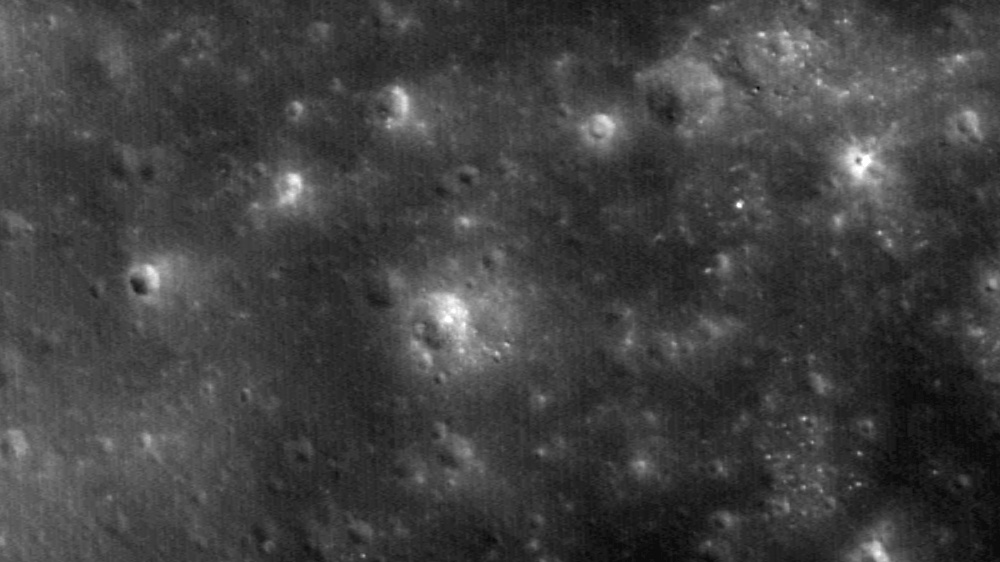
Before impact

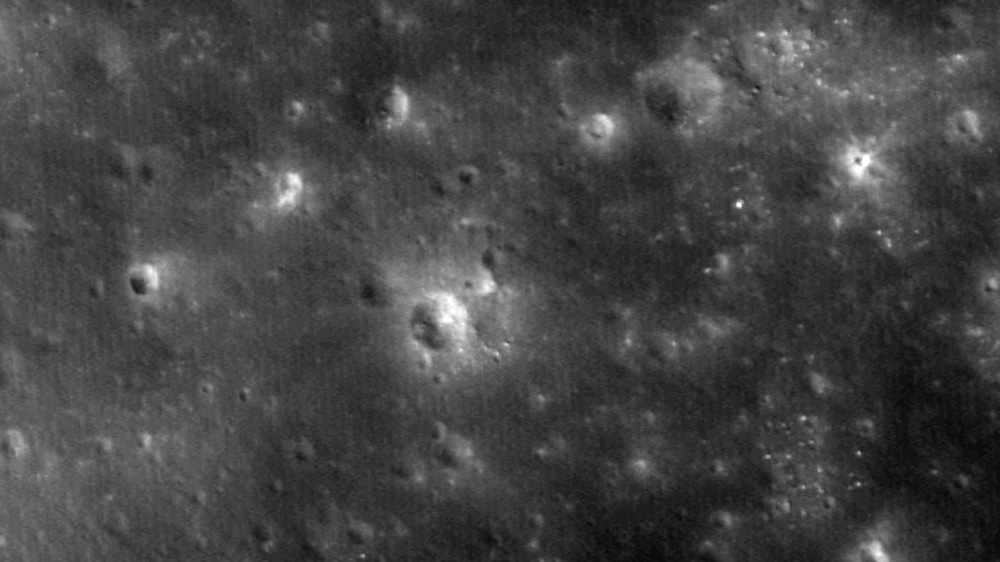
After impact

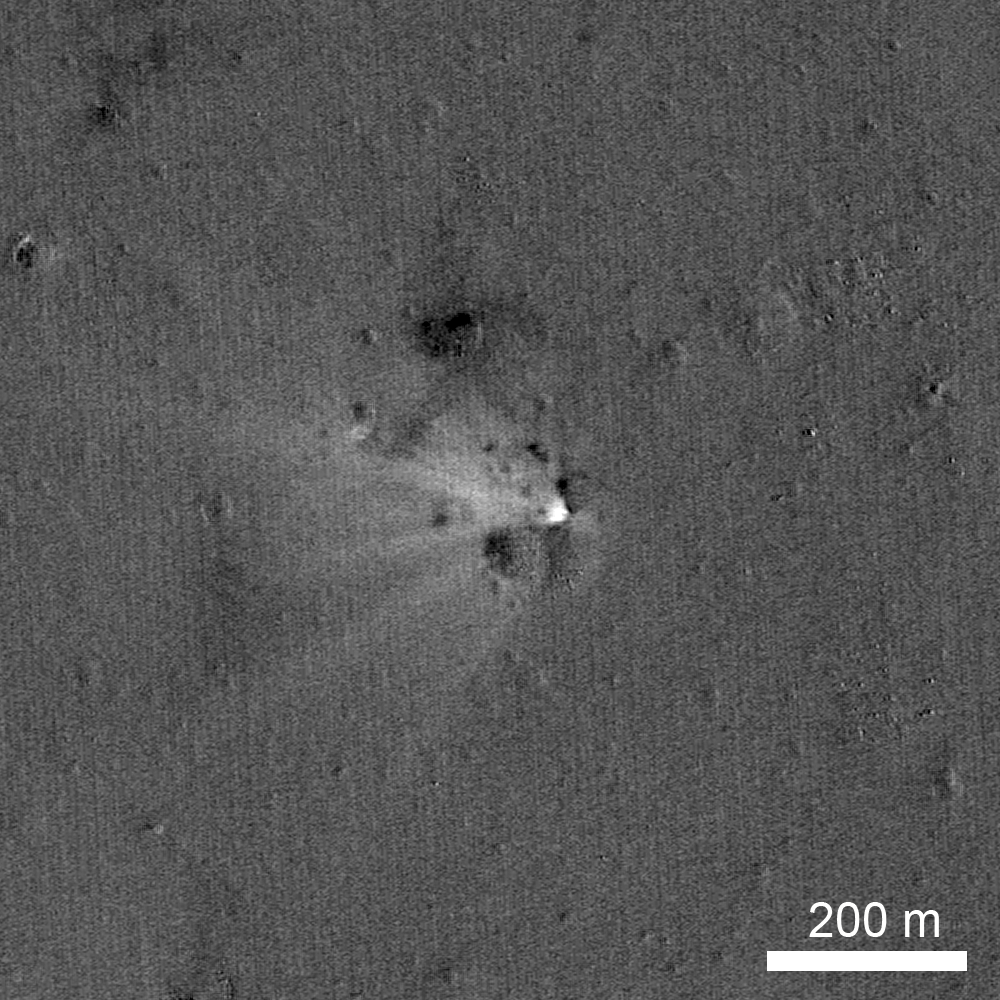
Superimposed images

Sundman V crater (eastern rim); April 18, 2014

== See also ==
- 1424 Sundmania, asteroid
