= Karl F. Sundman =

Finnish mathematician (1873–1949)

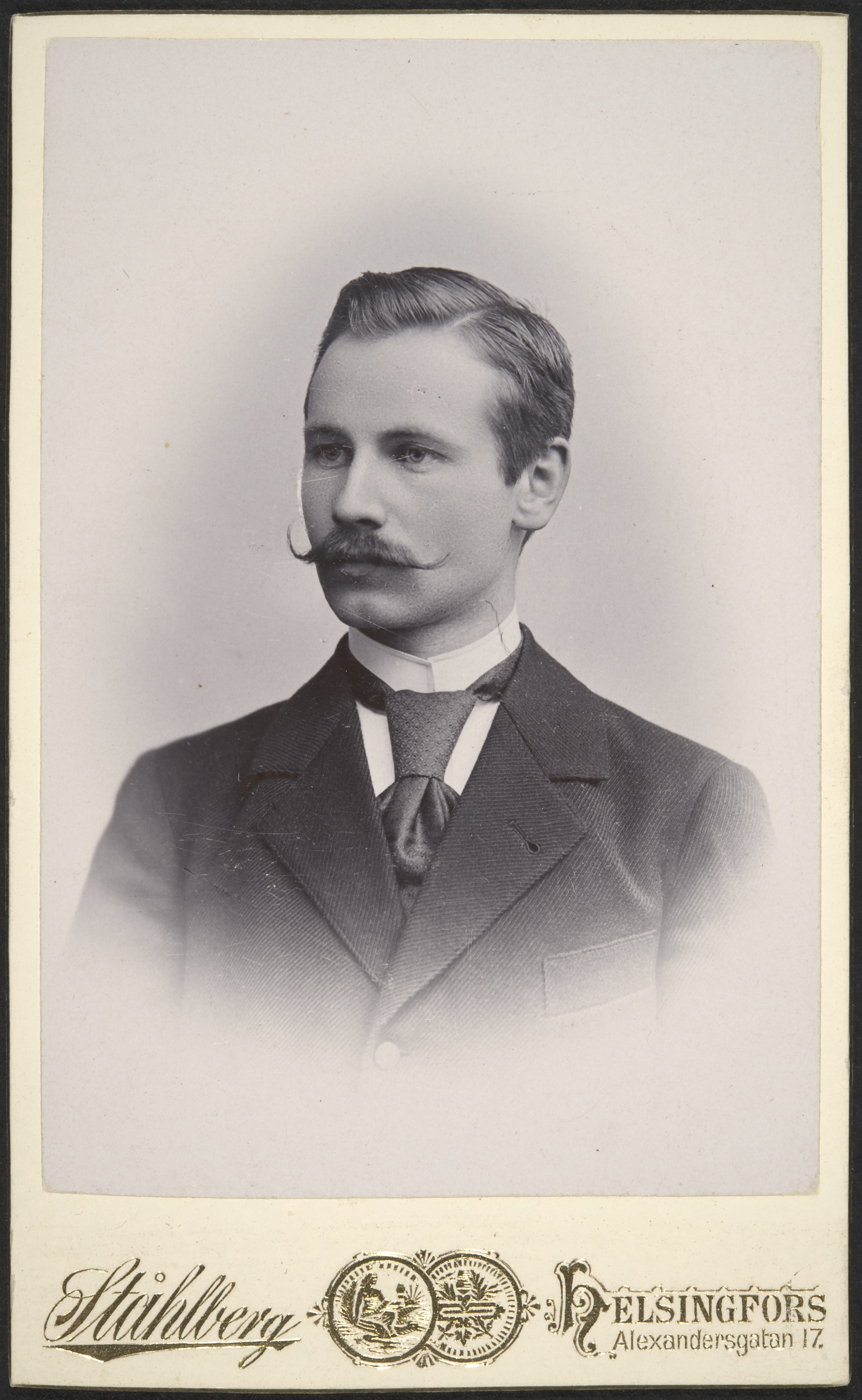
Karl F. Sundman.

Karl Frithiof Sundman (28 October 1873, in Kaskinen – 28 September 1949, in Helsinki) was a Finnish mathematician who used analytic methods to prove the existence of a convergent infinite series solution to the three-body problem in two papers published in 1907 and 1909. His results gained fame when they were reproduced in Acta Mathematica in 1912. He also published a paper on regularization methods in mechanics in 1912.

== Awards, recognition ==
Sundman was awarded the Pontécoulant prize by the French Academy of Sciences in 1913 for his work on the 3-body problem. In 1908, Sundman was elected member of the Finnish Society of Sciences and Letters and in 1947 foreign member of the Royal Swedish Academy of Sciences. The crater Sundman on the Moon is named after him, as is the asteroid 1424 Sundmania.

== See also ==
- Qiudong Wang generalized Sundman's solution to the case of more than three bodies In the 1990s.

== Sources ==
- Järnefelt, G.: "Karl Fridhiof Sundman." Soc. Sci. Fenn. Arsbok 30 (2) (1953), 1–13.
- Järnefelt, G.: "Karl F. Sundman in Memoriam." Acta Mathematica 83 (1950), i–vi.
- Barrow-Green, June (2010). "The dramatic episode of Sundman. Historia Mathematica, 37 (2): 164-203.
