= Liao Shijun =

Chinese physicist and mathematician

Liao Shijun (Chinese: 廖世俊; pinyin: Liào Shìjùn; born September 15, 1963) is a fluid mechanics and applied mathematics expert working in homotopy analysis method (HAM), nonlinear waves, nonlinear dynamics, and applied mathematics. He was born in Wuhan, China. Liao is a professor at Shanghai Jiao Tong University.
