= Q. Wang (artist) =

Chinese-American contemporary artist

Q. Wang (born 1962) is a Chinese-American contemporary artist. He briefly studied oil painting at the West Los Angeles College, Ladera Heights, California and today lives and works in Las Vegas where he also maintains a gallery featuring his and others' artworks.

== Early life ==
Born in Changchun, China, Q. Wang spent most of childhood in a small village where his grandparents lived. He attended Zhongshan University, Guandong, China and is a primarily self-taught artist, having begun his professional career as a computer engineer and programmer

== Freeism ==
Wang coined the term freeism to describe his artistic practice. According to Q. Wang, Freeism means creating through an associative unrehearsed process, spontaneously using colors shapes, tones and brushwork without any real adherence to the objective world or naturalism. The contemplative, introspective tone and intent of Q. Wang's work merges styles of Contemporary Art and Chinese Culture. Because of the idiosyncratic nature of the artist's work, he can also be considered as an outsider artist, or a revolutionary artist.

Q. Wang characterizes his work as "a breaking of two-dimensional and three-dimensional planes" and existing somewhere in between. This metaphysical concept has its origins somewhere within Taoism. And indeed, Q. Wang strives to achieve an esoteric sensibility; there is a reductive evocation of the infinite void of the Dao. In his first work, My First Painting (2006) Q. Wang composes a visual and meditative study, through the monochromatic exploration of geometric volumes. This immaterial world of the imagination, spiritual, or psychic space is conceptually related to Surrealist automatism, yet much of Q. Wang's work is somewhere between a cool quiet abstraction and a color infused and simplified Fauvism such as Volcano.

Color is the key expressive tool, as seen in Q. Wang's examination of the persistence of the cycle of life in the abstract and mysterious picture Life in which a seemingly hapless but determined tiny green sapling sails in a sky like expanse of infinite space of rich blues and purples. Large expanses of color dominate in the painting Las Vegas, the composition and scale reminiscent of the later work of Philip Guston, the magnification of abstracted everyday objects in inexplicable space seem almost modernist.

While Q. Wang considers his work completely original and certainly, it is creatively unique. There are some obvious comparisons to European Primitivism, Folk Art and Abstraction. This is seen particularly in works like iconic painting Adam and Eve, a vibrantly yellow painting that features a black limbed tree bearing a morbid fruit, tiny human skulls, the couple contemplating this temptation. Equally dark is Birthday Gift, the background is an oceanic blue, and at the center is a naked woman atop a black birthday cake, a bottle, and wine glass floating in undifferentiated space. Light, saturation, and divided curvilinear shapes inhabit his paintings such as Water, China, which simply captures the flow of the elements in verdant palette The strange vortex of the painting Seoul, Korea is a compelling vignette, the colours perfectly capturing the loudness, and busy colours of a city. The simplicity, bright palette and contemplative tone of Q. Wang's oeuvre is part of self-directed introspective process, however we can see visual mirroring of the use of "primitivism" seen in early 20th century European artists. The artist has said he is inspired by the French artist Maurice Utrillo, having encountered his work by chance (via prints on sale at yard sale).

"As the famous French film producer Jean-Luc Godard said, it's not where you take things from – it's where you take them to." "Q. Wang has taken me further into the appreciation of my surroundings, people, and love. That is what art is all about."—Gary Sorkin

== Awards ==
2018, Won Bauhaus Prairie Gallery -- Best of Show
2020, Won Art Room Gallery – Merit Award
2020, Won Grey Cube Gallery – Merit Award
2020, Won National Art League 90th Annual Award
