= Dipole anisotropy =

Form of anisotropy

Dipole anisotropy is a form of anisotropy and the progressive difference in the frequency of radiation from opposite directions due to the motion of the observer relative to the source. As a result of that motion, one end of the 360-degree spectrum is redshifted, whereas the other end is blueshifted. That effect is notable in measurements of the cosmic microwave background radiation, due to the motion of the Earth.
