= Qiudong Wang =

American astronomer

Qiudong Wang is a professor at the Department of Mathematics, the University of Arizona. In 1982, he received a B.S. at Nanjing University and in 1994 a Ph.D. at the University of Cincinnati.

Wang is best known for his 1991 paper The global solution of the n-body problem, in which he generalised Karl F. Sundman's results from 1912 to a system of more than three bodies. However, L. K. Babadzanjanz claims to have made the same generalization earlier, in 1979.
