= Binet equation =

Equation giving the form of a central force

The Binet equation, derived by Jacques Philippe Marie Binet, provides the form of a central force given the shape of the orbital motion in plane polar coordinates. The equation can also be used to derive the shape of the orbit for a given force law, but this usually involves the solution to a second order nonlinear, ordinary differential equation. A unique solution is impossible in the case of circular motion about the center of force.

== Equation ==
The shape of an orbit is often conveniently described in terms of relative distance $r$ as a function of angle $\theta$. For the Binet equation, the orbital shape is instead more concisely described by the reciprocal $u = 1/r$ as a function of $\theta$. Define the specific angular momentum as $h=L/m$ where $L$ is the angular momentum and $m$ is the mass. The Binet equation, derived in the next section, gives the force in terms of the function $u(\theta)$:
$$F(u^{-1}) = -m h^2 u^2 \left(\frac{\mathrm{d}^{2}u}{\mathrm{d}\theta ^2}+u\right).$$

== Derivation ==
Newton's second law for a purely central force is
$$F(r) = m \left(\ddot{r}-r\dot{\theta }^2\right).$$

The conservation of angular momentum requires that
$$r^{2}\dot{\theta } = h = \text{constant}.$$

Derivatives of $r$ with respect to time may be rewritten as derivatives of $u=1/r$ with respect to angle:
$$\begin{align}
&\frac{\mathrm{d}u}{\mathrm{d}\theta } = \frac{\mathrm{d}}{\mathrm{d}t}\left(\frac{1}{r}\right)\frac{\mathrm{d}t}{\mathrm{d}\theta }=-\frac{{\dot{r}}}{r^{2}\dot{\theta }}=-\frac{{\dot{r}}}{h} \\
& \frac{\mathrm{d}^{2}u}{\mathrm{d}\theta ^{2}}=-\frac{1}{h}\frac{\mathrm{d}\dot{r}}{\mathrm{d}t}\frac{\mathrm{d}t}{\mathrm{d}\theta }=-\frac{\ddot{r}}{h\dot{\theta }} = -\frac{\ddot{r}}{h^2 u^2}
\end{align}$$
Combining all of the above, we arrive at
$$\begin{align}
F & = m\left(\ddot{r}-r\dot{\theta }^2\right) \\
& = -m\left(h^2 u^2 \frac{\mathrm{d}^{2}u}{\mathrm{d}\theta ^2} +h^{2}u^{3}\right) \\
& = -mh^{2}u^{2}\left(\frac{\mathrm{d}^{2}u}{\mathrm{d}\theta ^{2}}+u\right)
\end{align}$$
The general solution is
$$\theta = \int_{r_0}^r \frac{\mathrm dr}{r^2\sqrt{\frac{2m}{L^2} (E-V) - \frac{1}{r^2}}} + \theta_0$$
where $(r_0, \theta_0)$ is the initial coordinate of the particle, $V$ the potential energy and $E$ the total energy ($E=T+V$).

== Examples ==
=== Kepler problem ===
==== Classical ====
The traditional Kepler problem of calculating the orbit of an inverse square law may be read off from the Binet equation as the solution to the differential equation
$$-k u^2 = -m h^2 u^2 \left(\frac{\mathrm{d}^{2}u}{\mathrm{d}\theta ^{2}}+u\right)$$
$$\frac{\mathrm{d}^{2}u}{\mathrm{d}\theta ^{2}}+u = \frac{k}{mh^2} \equiv \text{constant}>0.$$

If the angle $\theta$ is measured from the periapsis, then the general solution for the orbit expressed in (reciprocal) polar coordinates is
$$l u = 1 + \varepsilon \cos\theta.$$

The above polar equation describes conic sections, with $l$ the semi-latus rectum (equal to $h^2/\mu = h^2m/k$) and $\varepsilon$ the orbital eccentricity.

==== Relativistic ====
The relativistic equation derived for a De Sitter–Schwarzschild metric is
$$\frac{\mathrm{d}^{2}u}{\mathrm{d}\phi^{2}}+u=
\begin{cases}
\dfrac{r_s c^2}{2h^2}
+\dfrac{3}{2}r_s u^2
-\dfrac{\Lambda c^2}{3h^2u^3}
& \text{(particle)} \\[1.2em]
\dfrac{3}{2}r_s u^2
& \text{(photon)}
\end{cases}$$
where $c$ is the speed of light, $r_s$ is the Schwarzschild radius and $\Lambda$ is the cosmological constant. And for Reissner–Nordström metric we will obtain
$$\frac{\mathrm{d}^{2}u}{\mathrm{d}\phi^{2}}+u=
\begin{cases}
\dfrac{r_s c^2}{2h^2}
+\dfrac{3}{2}r_s u^2
-\dfrac{GQ^{2}}{4\pi\varepsilon_0 c^{4}}
\left(\dfrac{c^2}{h^2}u+2u^3\right)
& \text{(particle)} \\[1.2em]
\dfrac{3}{2}r_s u^2
-\dfrac{GQ^{2}}{2\pi\varepsilon_0 c^{4}}u^3
& \text{(photon)}
\end{cases}$$
where $Q$ is the electric charge and $\varepsilon_0$ is the vacuum permittivity.

=== Inverse Kepler problem ===
Consider the inverse Kepler problem. What kind of force law produces a noncircular elliptical orbit (or more generally a noncircular conic section) around a focus of the ellipse?

Differentiating twice the above polar equation for an ellipse gives
$$l \, \frac{\mathrm{d}^{2}u}{\mathrm{d}\theta ^2} = - \varepsilon \cos \theta.$$

The force law is therefore
$$\begin{align}
F   & = -mh^{2}u^{2} \left(\frac{- \varepsilon \cos \theta}{l}+\frac{1 + \varepsilon \cos \theta}{l}\right) \\
& = -\frac{m h^2 u^2}{l} \\
& = -\frac{m h^2}{l r^2},
\end{align}$$
which is the anticipated inverse square law. Matching the orbital $h^2/l = \mu$ to physical values like $GM$ or $k_e q_1 q_2/m$ reproduces Newton's law of universal gravitation or Coulomb's law, respectively.

The effective force for Schwarzschild coordinates is
$$\begin{align}
F   & = -GMmu^2 \left[ 1+3\left(\frac{hu}{c}\right)^2 \right] \\
& = - \frac{GMm}{r^2} \left[ 1+3\left(\frac{h}{rc}\right)^2 \right].
\end{align}$$
where the second term is an inverse-quartic force corresponding to quadrupole effects such as the angular shift of periapsis (It can be also obtained via retarded potentials).

In the parameterized post-Newtonian formalism we will obtain
$$F = -\frac{GMm}{r^2} \left[ 1+(2+2\gamma-\beta)\left(\frac{h}{rc}\right)^2 \right].$$
where $\gamma = \beta = 1$ for the general relativity and $\gamma = \beta = 0$ in the classical case.

=== Cotes spirals ===
An inverse cube force law has the form
$$F(r) = -\frac{k}{r^3}.$$

The shapes of the orbits of an inverse cube law are known as Cotes spirals. The Binet equation shows that the orbits must be solutions to the equation
$$\frac{\mathrm{d}^2 u}{\mathrm{d}\theta^2}+u=\frac{k u}{m h^2} = C u.$$

The differential equation has three kinds of solutions, in analogy to the different conic sections of the Kepler problem. When $C < 1$, the solution is the epispiral, including the pathological case of a straight line when $C = 0$. When $C = 1$, the solution is the hyperbolic spiral. When $C > 1$ the solution is Poinsot's spiral.

=== Off-axis circular motion ===
Although the Binet equation fails to give a unique force law for circular motion about the center of force, the equation can provide a force law when the circle's center and the center of force do not coincide. Consider for example a circular orbit that passes directly through the center of force. A (reciprocal) polar equation for such a circular orbit of diameter $D$ is
$$D \, u(\theta)= \sec \theta.$$

Differentiating $u$ twice and making use of the Pythagorean identity gives
$$\begin{align}
D \, \frac{\mathrm{d}^{2}u}{\mathrm{d}\theta ^2} & = \sec \theta \tan^2 \theta + \sec^3 \theta \\
& = \sec \theta (\sec^2 \theta - 1) + \sec^3 \theta \\
& = 2 D^3 u^3-D \, u.
\end{align}$$

The force law is thus
$$\begin{align}
F   & = -mh^2u^2 \left( 2 D^2 u^3- u + u\right) \\
& = -2mh^2D^2u^5  \\
& = -\frac{2mh^2D^2}{r^5}.
\end{align}$$

Note that solving the general inverse problem, i.e. constructing the orbits of an attractive $1/r^5$ force law, is a considerably more difficult problem because it is equivalent to solving
$$\frac{\mathrm{d}^{2}u}{\mathrm{d}\theta ^{2}}+u=Cu^3$$

which is a second order nonlinear differential equation.

== See also ==
- Bohr–Sommerfeld quantization § Relativistic orbit
- Classical central-force problem
- General relativity
- Two-body problem in general relativity
- Bertrand's theorem
