= Newton's theorem of revolving orbits =

Theorem in classical mechanics

Figure 1: An attractive force F(r) causes the blue planet to move on the cyan circle. The green planet moves three times faster and thus requires a stronger centripetal force, which is supplied by adding an attractive inverse-cube force. The red planet is stationary; the force F(r) is balanced by a repulsive inverse-cube force. A GIF version of this animation is found here.

Figure 2: The radius r of the green and blue planets are the same, but their angular speed differs by a factor k. Examples of such orbits are shown in Figures 1 and 3–5.

In classical mechanics, Newton's theorem of revolving orbits identifies the type of central force needed to multiply the angular speed of a particle by a factor k without affecting its radial motion (Figures 1 and 2). Newton applied his theorem to understanding the overall rotation of orbits (apsidal precession, Figure 3) that is observed for the Moon and planets. The term "radial motion" signifies the motion towards or away from the center of force, whereas the angular motion is perpendicular to the radial motion.

Isaac Newton derived this theorem in Propositions 43–45 of Book I of his Philosophiæ Naturalis Principia Mathematica, first published in 1687. In Proposition 43, he showed that the added force must be a central force, one whose magnitude depends only upon the distance r between the particle and a point fixed in space (the center). In Proposition 44, he derived a formula for the force, showing that it was an inverse-cube force, one that varies as the inverse cube of r. In Proposition 45 Newton extended his theorem to arbitrary central forces by assuming that the particle moved in nearly circular orbit.

This theorem remained largely unknown and undeveloped for over three centuries but has been recently revisited and generalized.

== Historical context ==
=== Prior to Newton ===
The motion of astronomical bodies has been studied systematically for thousands of years. The stars were observed to rotate uniformly, always maintaining the same relative positions to one another. However, other bodies were observed to wander against the background of the fixed stars; most such bodies were called planets after the Greek word "πλανήτοι" (planētoi) for "wanderers". Although they generally move in the same direction along a path across the sky (the ecliptic), individual planets sometimes reverse their direction briefly, exhibiting retrograde motion.

To describe this forward-and-backward motion within a geocentric model, ancient astronomers including Apollonius of Perga (c. 262 – c. 190 BC) developed the concept of deferents and epicycles, according to which the planets are carried on rotating circles that are themselves carried on other rotating circles, and so on. Roughly 350 years later, Claudius Ptolemaeus published his Almagest, in which he developed this system to match the best astronomical observations of his era. This model of the universe was authoritative for nearly 1500 years.

Figure 3: Planets orbiting the Sun follow elliptical orbits that gradually rotate over time (apsidal precession). The eccentricity of this ellipse is exaggerated for visualization. Most orbits in the Solar System have a much smaller eccentricity, making them nearly circular. A GIF version of this animation is found here.

The modern understanding of planetary motion arose from the combined efforts of astronomer Tycho Brahe and physicist Johannes Kepler in the 16th century. Tycho is credited with extremely accurate measurements of planetary motions, from which Kepler was able to derive his laws of planetary motion. According to these laws, planets move on ellipses (not epicycles) about the Sun (not the Earth). Kepler's second and third laws make specific quantitative predictions: planets sweep out equal areas in equal time, and the square of their orbital periods equals a fixed constant times the cube of their semi-major axis. Subsequent observations of the planetary orbits showed that the long axis of the ellipse (the so-called line of apsides) rotates gradually with time; this rotation is known as apsidal precession. The apses of an orbit are the points at which the orbiting body is closest or furthest away from the attracting center; for planets orbiting the Sun, the apses correspond to the perihelion (closest) and aphelion (furthest).

=== Newton's Principia ===
With the publication of his Principia roughly eighty years later (1687), Isaac Newton provided a physical theory that accounted for all three of Kepler's laws, a theory based on Newton's laws of motion and his law of universal gravitation. In particular, Newton proposed that the gravitational force between any two bodies was a central force F(r) that varied as the inverse square of the distance r between them. Arguing from his laws of motion, Newton showed that the orbit of any particle acted upon by one such force is always a conic section, specifically an ellipse if it does not go to infinity. This result is known as solving the Kepler problem. However, this conclusion holds only when two bodies are present (the two-body problem); the motion of three bodies or more acting under their mutual gravitation (the n-body problem) remained unsolved for centuries after Newton, although solutions to a few special cases were discovered. Newton proposed that the orbits of planets about the Sun are largely elliptical because the Sun's gravitation is dominant; to first approximation, the presence of the other planets can be ignored. By analogy, the elliptical orbit of the Moon about the Earth was dominated by the Earth's gravity; to first approximation, the Sun's gravity and those of other bodies of the Solar System can be neglected. However, Newton stated that the gradual apsidal precession of the planetary and lunar orbits was due to the effects of these neglected interactions; in particular, he stated that the precession of the Moon's orbit was due to the perturbing effects of gravitational interactions with the Sun.

Newton's theorem of revolving orbits was his first attempt to understand apsidal precession quantitatively. According to this theorem, the addition of a particular type of central force—the inverse-cube force—can produce a rotating orbit; the angular speed is multiplied by a factor k, whereas the radial motion is left unchanged. However, this theorem is restricted to a specific type of force that may not be relevant; several perturbing inverse-square interactions (such as those of other planets) seem unlikely to sum exactly to an inverse-cube force. To make his theorem applicable to other types of forces, Newton found the best approximation of an arbitrary central force F(r) to an inverse-cube potential in the limit of nearly circular orbits, that is, elliptical orbits of low eccentricity, as is indeed true for most orbits in the Solar System. To find this approximation, Newton developed an infinite series that can be viewed as the forerunner of the Taylor expansion. This approximation allowed Newton to estimate the rate of precession for arbitrary central forces. Newton applied this approximation to test models of the force causing the apsidal precession of the Moon's orbit. However, the problem of the Moon's motion is dauntingly complex, and Newton never published an accurate gravitational model of the Moon's apsidal precession. After a more accurate model by Clairaut in 1747, analytical models of the Moon's motion were developed in the late 19th century by Hill, Brown, and Delaunay.

However, Newton's theorem is more general than merely explaining apsidal precession. It describes the effects of adding an inverse-cube force to any central force F(r), not only to inverse-square forces such as Newton's law of universal gravitation and Coulomb's law. Newton's theorem simplifies orbital problems in classical mechanics by eliminating inverse-cube forces from consideration. The radial and angular motions, r(t) and θ_{1}(t), can be calculated without the inverse-cube force; afterwards, its effect can be calculated by multiplying the angular speed of the particle
$$\omega_2 = \frac{d\theta_2}{dt} = k \frac{d\theta_1}{dt} = k \omega_1.$$

=== Modern revisions ===
This theorem remained largely unknown and undeveloped for over three centuries, as noted by astrophysicist Subrahmanyan Chandrasekhar in his 1995 commentary on Newton's Principia. E. T. Whittaker discussed the concept in his classic text but modern work restarted in 1997 when the theorem has been studied by Donald Lynden-Bell and collaborators.

The concept has also been extended to incorporate general relativity. Einstein field equations for gravity based on general relativity in the simple case of spherical symmetry can be shown to create an effective central force with an additional term proportional to $1/r^4$, resulting in a precession of elliptical orbits. For the orbit of Mercury about the Sun, this predicts a precession of 39.45 arc-sec/century, close to the observed 43 arc-sec/century.

Its first exact extension came in 2000 with the work of Mahomed and Vawda.

== Mathematical statement ==
Figure 4: All three planets share the same radial motion (cyan circle) but move at different angular speeds. The blue planet feels only an inverse-square force and moves on an ellipse (k = 1). The green planet moves angularly three times as fast as the blue planet (k = 3); it completes three orbits for every orbit of the blue planet. The red planet illustrates purely radial motion with no angular motion (k = 0). The paths followed by the green and blue planets are shown in Figure 9. A GIF version of this animation is found here.

Figure 5: The green planet moves angularly one-third as fast as the blue planet (k = 1/3); it completes one orbit for every three blue orbits. The paths followed by the green and blue planets are shown in Figure 10. A GIF version of this animation is found here.

Consider a particle moving under an arbitrary central force F_{1}(r) whose magnitude depends only on the distance r between the particle and a fixed center. Since the motion of a particle under a central force always lies in a plane, the position of the particle can be described by polar coordinates (r, θ_{1}), the radius and angle of the particle relative to the center of force (Figure 1). Both of these coordinates, r(t) and θ_{1}(t), change with time t as the particle moves.

Imagine a second particle with the same mass m and with the same radial motion r(t), but one whose angular speed is k times faster than that of the first particle. In other words, the azimuthal angles of the two particles are related by the equation θ_{2}(t) = kθ_{1}(t). Newton showed that the motion of the second particle can be produced by adding an inverse-cube central force to whatever force F_{1}(r) acts on the first particle
$$F_2(r) - F_1(r) = \frac{L_1^2}{mr^3} \left( 1 - k^2 \right)$$
where L_{1} is the magnitude of the first particle's angular momentum, which is a constant of motion (conserved) for central forces.

If k^{2} is greater than one, F_{2} − F_{1} is a negative number; thus, the added inverse-cube force is attractive, as observed in the green planet of Figures 1–4 and 9. By contrast, if k^{2} is less than one, F_{2} − F_{1} is a positive number; the added inverse-cube force is repulsive, as observed in the green planet of Figures 5 and 10, and in the red planet of Figures 4 and 5.

=== Alteration of the particle path ===
The addition of such an inverse-cube force also changes the path followed by the particle. The path of the particle ignores the time dependencies of the radial and angular motions, such as r(t) and θ_{1}(t); rather, it relates the radius and angle variables to one another. For this purpose, the angle variable is unrestricted and can increase indefinitely as the particle revolves around the central point multiple times. For example, if the particle revolves twice about the central point and returns to its starting position, its final angle is not the same as its initial angle; rather, it has increased by 2 × 360° = 720°. Formally, the angle variable is defined as the integral of the angular speed
$$\theta_1 \equiv \int \omega_1(t)\, dt.$$

A similar definition holds for θ_{2}, the angle of the second particle.

If the path of the first particle is described in the form r = g(θ_{1}), the path of the second particle is given by the function r = g(θ_{2}/k), since θ_{2} = kθ_{1}. For example, let the path of the first particle be an ellipse
$$\frac{1}{r} = A + B \cos \theta_1$$
where A and B are constants; then, the path of the second particle is given by
$$\frac{1}{r} = A + B \cos \left( \frac{\theta_2}{k} \right).$$

== Orbital precession ==
Newton's motivation in deriving his revolving orbit theorem was to create convincing evidence for the inverse-square power law of gravity. By proving mathematically that all other orbits precess he was able to claim that the absence of precision provided empirical proof for the law of gravity.

If k is close, but not equal, to one, the second orbit resembles the first, but revolves gradually about the center of force; this is known as orbital precession (Figure 3). If k is greater than one, the orbit precesses in the same direction as the orbit (Figure 3); if k is less than one, the orbit precesses in the opposite direction.

Although the orbit in Figure 3 may seem to rotate uniformly, i.e., at a constant angular speed, this is true only for circular orbits. If the orbit rotates at an angular speed Ω, the angular speed of the second particle is faster or slower than that of the first particle by Ω; in other words, the angular speeds would satisfy the equation ω_{2} = ω_{1} + Ω. However, Newton's theorem of revolving orbits states that the angular speeds are related by multiplication: ω_{2} = kω_{1}, where k is a constant. Combining these two equations shows that the angular speed of the precession equals Ω = (k − 1)ω_{1}. Hence, Ω is constant only if ω_{1} is constant. According to the conservation of angular momentum, ω_{1} changes with the radius r
$$\omega_1 = \frac{L_1}{m r^2};$$
where m and L_{1} are the first particle's mass and angular momentum, respectively, both of which are constant. Hence, ω_{1} is constant only if the radius r is constant, i.e., when the orbit is a circle. However, in that case, the orbit does not change as it precesses.

== Illustrative example: Cotes's spirals ==
Figure 6: For the blue particle moving in a straight line, the radius r from a given center varies with angle according to the equation b = r cos(θ − θ_{0}), where b is the distance of closest approach (impact parameter, shown in red).

The simplest illustration of Newton's theorem occurs when there is no initial force, i.e., F_{1}(r) = 0. In this case, the first particle is stationary or travels in a straight line. If it travels in a straight line that does not pass through the origin (yellow line in Figure 6) the equation for such a line may be written in the polar coordinates (r, θ_{1}) as
$$\frac{1}{r} = \frac{1}{b} \cos\ (\theta_1 - \theta_0)$$
where θ_{0} is the angle at which the distance is minimized (Figure 6). The distance r begins at infinity (when θ_{1} – θ_{0} = −90°), and decreases gradually until θ_{1} – θ_{0} = 0°, when the distance reaches a minimum, then gradually increases again to infinity at θ_{1} – θ_{0} = 90°. The minimum distance b is the impact parameter, which is defined as the length of the perpendicular from the fixed center to the line of motion. The same radial motion is possible when an inverse-cube central force is added.

Figure 7: Epispirals corresponding to k equal to 2/3 (red), 1.0 (black), 1.5 (green), 3.0 (cyan) and 6.0 (blue). When k is less than one, the inverse-cube force is repulsive, whereas when k is greater than one, the force is attractive.

An inverse-cube central force F_{2}(r) has the form
$$F_2(r) = \frac{\mu}{r^3}$$
where the numerator μ may be positive (repulsive) or negative (attractive). If such an inverse-cube force is introduced, Newton's theorem says that the corresponding solutions have a shape called Cotes's spirals. These are curves defined by the equation
$$\frac{1}{r} = \frac{1}{b} \cos \left(\frac{\theta_2 - \theta_0}{k} \right)$$
where the constant k equals
$$k^2 = 1 - \frac{m \mu}{L_1^2}$$

When the right-hand side of the equation is a positive real number, the solution corresponds to an epispiral. When the argument θ_{1} – θ_{0} = ±90° × k, the cosine goes to zero and the radius goes to infinity. Thus, when k is less than one, the range of allowed angles becomes small and the force is repulsive (red curve on right in Figure 7). On the other hand, when k is greater than one, the range of allowed angles increases, corresponding to an attractive force (green, cyan and blue curves on left in Figure 7); the orbit of the particle can even wrap around the center several times. The possible values of the parameter k may range from zero to infinity, which corresponds to values of μ ranging from negative infinity up to the positive upper limit, L_{1}^{2}/m. Thus, for all attractive inverse-cube forces (negative μ) there is a corresponding epispiral orbit, as for some repulsive ones (μ < L_{1}^{2}/m), as illustrated in Figure 7. Stronger repulsive forces correspond to a faster linear motion.

Figure 8: Poinsot spirals (cosh spirals) corresponding to λ equal to 1.0 (green), 3.0 (cyan) and 6.0 (blue).

One of the other solution types is given in terms of the hyperbolic cosine:
$$\frac{1}{r} = \frac{1}{b} \cosh \left(\frac{\theta_0 - \theta_2}{\lambda} \right)$$
where the constant λ satisfies
$$\lambda^2 = \frac{m \mu}{L_1^2} - 1$$

This form of Cotes's spirals corresponds to one of the two Poinsot's spirals (Figure 8). The possible values of λ range from zero to infinity, which corresponds to values of μ greater than the positive number L_{1}^{2}/m. Thus, Poinsot spiral motion only occurs for repulsive inverse-cube central forces, and applies in the case that L is not too large for the given μ.

Taking the limit of k or λ going to zero yields the third form of a Cotes's spiral, the so-called reciprocal spiral or hyperbolic spiral, as a solution
$$\frac{1}{r} = A \theta_2 + \varepsilon$$
where A and ε are arbitrary constants. Such curves result when the strength μ of the repulsive force exactly balances the angular momentum-mass term
$$\mu = \frac{L_1^2}{m}$$

== Closed orbits and inverse-cube central forces ==
Figure 9: Harmonic orbits with k = 1 (blue), 2 (magenta) and 3 (green). An animation of the blue and green orbits is shown in Figure 4.

Two types of central forces—those that increase linearly with distance, F = Cr, such as Hooke's law, and inverse-square forces, F = C/r^{2}, such as Newton's law of universal gravitation and Coulomb's law—have a very unusual property. A particle moving under either type of force always returns to its starting place with its initial velocity, provided that it lacks sufficient energy to move out to infinity. In other words, the path of a bound particle is always closed and its motion repeats indefinitely, no matter what its initial position or velocity. As shown by Bertrand's theorem, this property is not true for other types of forces; in general, a particle will not return to its starting point with the same velocity.

However, Newton's theorem shows that an inverse-cubic force may be applied to a particle moving under a linear or inverse-square force such that its orbit remains closed, provided that k equals a rational number. (A number is called "rational" if it can be written as a fraction m/n, where m and n are integers.) In such cases, the addition of the inverse-cubic force causes the particle to complete m rotations about the center of force in the same time that the original particle completes n rotations. This method for producing closed orbits does not violate Bertrand's theorem, because the added inverse-cubic force depends on the initial velocity of the particle.

Figure 10: Subharmonic orbits with k = 1 (blue), 1/2 (magenta) and 1/3 (green). An animation of the blue and green orbits is shown in Figure 5.

Harmonic and subharmonic orbits are special types of such closed orbits. A closed trajectory is called a harmonic orbit if k is an integer, i.e., if n = 1 in the formula k = m/n. For example, if k = 3 (green planet in Figures 1 and 4, green orbit in Figure 9), the resulting orbit is the third harmonic of the original orbit. Conversely, the closed trajectory is called a subharmonic orbit if k is the inverse of an integer, i.e., if m = 1 in the formula k = m/n. For example, if k = 1/3 (green planet in Figure 5, green orbit in Figure 10), the resulting orbit is called the third subharmonic of the original orbit. Although such orbits are unlikely to occur in nature, they are helpful for illustrating Newton's theorem.

== Limit of nearly circular orbits ==
In Proposition 45 of his Principia, Newton applies his theorem of revolving orbits to develop a method for finding the force laws that govern the motions of planets. Johannes Kepler had noted that the orbits of most planets and the Moon seemed to be ellipses, and the long axis of those ellipses can determined accurately from astronomical measurements. The long axis is defined as the line connecting the positions of minimum and maximum distances to the central point, i.e., the line connecting the two apses. For illustration, the long axis of the planet Mercury is defined as the line through its successive positions of perihelion and aphelion. Over time, the long axis of most orbiting bodies rotates gradually, generally no more than a few degrees per complete revolution, because of gravitational perturbations from other bodies, oblateness in the attracting body, general relativistic effects, and other effects. Newton's method uses this apsidal precession as a sensitive probe of the type of force being applied to the planets.

Newton's theorem describes only the effects of adding an inverse-cube central force. However, Newton extends his theorem to an arbitrary central force F(r) by restricting his attention to orbits that are nearly circular, such as ellipses with low orbital eccentricity (ε ≤ 0.1), which is true of seven of the eight planetary orbits in the Solar System. Newton also applied his theorem to the planet Mercury, which has an eccentricity ε of roughly 0.21, and suggested that it may pertain to Halley's Comet, whose orbit has an eccentricity of roughly 0.97.

A qualitative justification for this extrapolation of his method has been suggested by Valluri, Wilson and Harper. According to their argument, Newton considered the apsidal precession angle α (the angle between the vectors of successive minimum and maximum distance from the center) to be a smooth, continuous function of the orbital eccentricity ε. For the inverse-square force, α equals 180°; the vectors to the positions of minimum and maximum distances lie on the same line. If α is initially not 180° at low ε (quasi-circular orbits) then, in general, α will equal 180° only for isolated values of ε; a randomly chosen value of ε would be very unlikely to give α = 180°. Therefore, the observed slow rotation of the apsides of planetary orbits suggest that the force of gravity is an inverse-square law.

=== Quantitative formula ===
To paraphrase Newton's argument in modern notation and terminology, he writes F(r) in terms of a new function C(r)
$$F(r) = \frac{C(r)}{R r^3}$$
where R is the average radius of the nearly circular orbit. Newton expands C(r) in a series—now known as a Taylor expansion—in powers of the distance r, one of the first appearances of such a series. By equating the resulting inverse-cube force term with the inverse-cube force for revolving orbits, Newton derives an equivalent angular scaling factor k for nearly circular orbits:
$$\frac{1}{k^2} = \left( \frac{R}{C} \right) \left. \frac{dC}{dr} \right|_{r=R}$$

In other words, the application of an arbitrary central force F(r) to a nearly circular elliptical orbit can accelerate the angular motion by the factor k without affecting the radial motion significantly. If an elliptical orbit is stationary, the particle rotates about the center of force by 180° as it moves from one end of the long axis to the other (the two apses). Thus, the corresponding apsidal angle α for a general central force equals k × 180°, using the general law θ_{2} = kθ_{1}.

=== Examples ===
Newton illustrates his formula with three examples. In the first two, the central force is a power law, F(r) = r^{n−3}, so C(r) is proportional to r^{n}. The formula above indicates that the angular motion is multiplied by a factor k = 1/√n, so that the apsidal angle α equals 180°/√n.

This angular scaling can be seen in the apsidal precession, i.e., in the gradual rotation of the long axis of the ellipse (Figure 3). As noted above, the orbit as a whole rotates with a mean angular speed Ω = (k − 1)ω, where ω equals the mean angular speed of the particle about the stationary ellipse. If the particle requires a time T to move from one apse to the other, this implies that, in the same time, the long axis will rotate by an angle β = ΩT = (k − 1)ωT = (k − 1) × 180°. For an inverse-square law such as Newton's law of universal gravitation, where n equals 1, there is no angular scaling (k = 1), the apsidal angle α is 180°, and the elliptical orbit is stationary (Ω = β = 0).

As a final illustration, Newton considers a sum of two power laws
$$C(r) \propto a r^m + b r^n$$
which multiplies the angular speed by a factor
$$k = \sqrt{\frac{a + b}{am + bn}}$$

Newton applies both of these formulae (the power law and sum of two power laws) to examine the apsidal precession of the Moon's orbit.

== Precession of the Moon's orbit ==
The Moon's motion is more complex than those of the planets, mainly due to the competing gravitational pulls of the Earth and the Sun.

The motion of the Moon can be measured accurately, and is noticeably more complex than that of the planets. The ancient Greek astronomers, Hipparchus and Ptolemy, had noted several periodic variations in the Moon's orbit, such as small oscillations in its orbital eccentricity and the inclination of its orbit to the plane of the ecliptic. These oscillations generally occur on a once-monthly or twice-monthly time-scale. The line of its apses precesses gradually with a period of roughly 8.85 years, while its line of nodes turns a full circle in roughly double that time, 18.6 years. This accounts for the roughly 18-year periodicity of eclipses, the so-called Saros cycle. However, both lines experience small fluctuations in their motion, again on the monthly time-scale.

In 1673, Jeremiah Horrocks published a reasonably accurate model of the Moon's motion in which the Moon was assumed to follow a precessing elliptical orbit. A sufficiently accurate and simple method for predicting the Moon's motion would have solved the navigational problem of determining a ship's longitude; in Newton's time, the goal was to predict the Moon's position to 2′ (two arc-minutes), which would correspond to a 1° error in terrestrial longitude. Horrocks's model predicted the lunar position with errors no more than 10 arc-minutes; for comparison, the diameter of the Moon is roughly 30 arc-minutes.

Newton used his theorem of revolving orbits in two ways to account for the apsidal precession of the Moon. First, he showed that the Moon's observed apsidal precession could be accounted for by changing the force law of gravity from an inverse-square law to a power law in which the exponent was 2 + 4/243 (roughly 2.0165)
$$F(r) = - \frac{GMm}{r^{2 + 4/243}}$$

In 1894, Asaph Hall adopted this approach of modifying the exponent in the inverse-square law slightly to explain an anomalous orbital precession of the planet Mercury, which had been observed in 1859 by Urbain Le Verrier. Ironically, Hall's theory was ruled out by careful astronomical observations of the Moon. The currently accepted explanation for this precession involves the theory of general relativity, which (to first approximation) adds an inverse-quartic force, i.e., one that varies as the inverse fourth power of distance.

As a second approach to explaining the Moon's precession, Newton suggested that the perturbing influence of the Sun on the Moon's motion might be approximately equivalent to an additional linear force
$$F(r) = \frac{A}{r^2} + B r$$

The first term corresponds to the gravitational attraction between the Moon and the Earth, where r is the Moon's distance from the Earth. The second term, so Newton reasoned, might represent the average perturbing force of the Sun's gravity of the Earth-Moon system. Such a force law could also result if the Earth were surrounded by a spherical dust cloud of uniform density. Using the formula for k for nearly circular orbits, and estimates of A and B, Newton showed that this force law could not account for the Moon's precession, since the predicted apsidal angle α was (≈ 180.76°) rather than the observed α (≈ 181.525°). For every revolution, the long axis would rotate 1.5°, roughly half of the observed 3.0°.

== Generalization ==
Isaac Newton first published his theorem in 1687, as Propositions 43–45 of Book I of his Philosophiæ Naturalis Principia Mathematica. However, as astrophysicist Subrahmanyan Chandrasekhar noted in his 1995 commentary on Newton's Principia, the theorem remained largely unknown and undeveloped for over three centuries.

Newton assumed that the angular motion of the second particle was k times faster than that of the first particle, θ_{2} = kθ_{1}. The radial motion of the two particles be the same, r_{1} = r_{2}. It is possible to extend the treatment to allow the inverse radii be related by a linear equation
$$\frac{1}{r_2(t)} = \frac{a}{r_1(t)} + b$$

This transformation of the variables changes the path of the particle. If the path of the first particle is written r_{1} = g(θ_{1}), the second particle's path can be written as
$$\frac{a r_2}{1 - b r_2} = g{\left( \frac{\theta_2}{k} \right)}$$

If the motion of the first particle is produced by a central force F_{1}(r), Mahomed and Vawda showed that the motion of the second particle can be produced by the following force
$$F_2(r_2) = \frac{a^3}{\left( 1 - b r_2 \right)^2} F_1{\left( \frac{a r_2}{1 - b r_2} \right)} +
\frac{L^2}{mr^3} \left( 1 - k^2 \right) - \frac{bL^2}{mr^2}$$

According to this equation, the second force F_{2}(r) is obtained by scaling the first force and changing its argument, as well as by adding inverse-square and inverse-cube central forces.

For comparison, Newton's theorem of revolving orbits corresponds to the case a = 1 and b = 0, so that r_{1} = r_{2}. In this case, the original force is not scaled, and its argument is unchanged; the inverse-cube force is added, but the inverse-square term is not. Also, the path of the second particle is r_{2} = g(θ_{2}/k), consistent with the formula given above.

== Newton's derivation ==
Newton's derivation is found in Section IX of his Principia, specifically Propositions 43–45. His derivations of these Propositions are based largely on geometry.

=== Proposition 43; Problem 30 ===
Diagram illustrating Newton's derivation. The blue planet follows the dashed elliptical orbit, whereas the green planet follows the solid elliptical orbit; the two ellipses share a common focus at the point C. The angles UCP and VCQ both equal θ_{1}, whereas the black arc represents the angle UCQ, which equals θ_{2} = k θ_{1}. The solid ellipse has rotated relative to the dashed ellipse by the angle UCV, which equals (k − 1) θ_{1}. All three planets (red, blue and green) are at the same distance r from the center of force C.

It is required to make a body move in a curve that revolves about the center of force in the same manner as another body in the same curve at rest.

Newton's derivation of Proposition 43 depends on his Proposition 2, derived earlier in the Principia. Proposition 2 provides a geometrical test for whether the net force acting on a point mass (a particle) is a central force. Newton showed that a force is central if and only if the particle sweeps out equal areas in equal times as measured from the center.

Newton's derivation begins with a particle moving under an arbitrary central force F_{1}(r); the motion of this particle under this force is described by its radius r(t) from the center as a function of time, and also its angle θ_{1}(t). In an infinitesimal time dt, the particle sweeps out an approximate right triangle whose area is
$$dA_1 = \frac{1}{2} r^2 d\theta_1$$
Since the force acting on the particle is assumed to be a central force, the particle sweeps out equal angles in equal times, by Newton's Proposition 2. A second particle whose orbit has the same radius, and whose angular variation is multiplied by a constant factor k, will in the same time increment dt sweep out an area
$$dA_2 = \frac{1}{2} r^2 d\theta_2 = \frac{1}{2} r^2 k d\theta_1$$
The ratio of dA_{2} to dA_{1} is k for any infinitesimal time increment, and so it is generally true that the second particle sweeps out k times as much area as the first particle in the same amount of time. Therefore, the second particle also sweeps out equal areas in equal times, and by Proposition 2, the second particle is also acted upon by a central force F_{2}(r).

=== Proposition 44 ===
The difference of the forces, by which two bodies may be made to move equally, one in a fixed, the other in the same orbit revolving, varies inversely as the cube of their common altitudes.

To find the magnitude of F_{2}(r) from the original central force F_{1}(r), Newton calculated their difference F_{2}(r) − F_{1}(r) using geometry and the definition of centripetal acceleration. In Proposition 44 of his Principia, he showed that the difference is proportional to the inverse cube of the radius. Newton expresses this difference in terms of the two constant rates of sweeping out areas; writing them as h_{1} and h_{2}, one has
$$F_2(r) - F_1(r) = m \frac{h_1^2 - h_2^2}{r^3}$$

=== Proposition 45; Problem 31 ===
To find the motion of the apsides in orbits approaching very near to circles.

In this Proposition, Newton derives the consequences of his theorem of revolving orbits in the limit of nearly circular orbits. This approximation is valid for the orbit of the Moon about the Earth, the problem that may have been Newton's motivation for developing the theorem. This approximation also allows Newton to consider a great variety of central force laws, not merely inverse-square and inverse-cube force laws.

== Modern derivation ==
Modern derivations of Newton's theorem have been published by Whittaker (1937) and Chandrasekhar (1995). By assumption, the second angular speed is k times faster than the first
$$\omega_2 = \frac{d\theta_2}{dt} = k \frac{d\theta_1}{dt} = k \omega_1$$

Since the two radii have the same behavior with time, r(t), the conserved angular momenta are related by the same factor k
$$L_2 = m r^2 \omega_2 = m r^2 k \omega_1 = k L_1 \,\!$$

The equation of motion for a radius r of a particle of mass m moving in a central potential V(r) is given by Lagrange's equations
$$m\frac{d^2 r}{dt^2} - mr \omega^2 =
m\frac{d^2 r}{dt^2} - \frac{L^2}{mr^3} = F(r)$$

Applying the general formula to the two orbits yields the equation
$$\begin{align}
m\frac{d^2 r}{dt^2} &= F_1(r) + \frac{L_1^2}{mr^3} \\[1ex]
&= F_2(r) + \frac{L_2^2}{mr^3}
= F_2(r) + \frac{k^2 L_1^2}{mr^3}
\end{align}$$
which can be re-arranged to the form
$$F_2(r) = F_1(r) + \frac{L_1^2}{mr^3} \left( 1 - k^2 \right)$$

This equation relating the two radial forces can be understood qualitatively as follows. The difference in angular speeds (or equivalently, in angular momenta) causes a difference in the centripetal force requirement; to offset this, the radial force must be altered with an inverse-cube force.

== See also ==
- Laplace–Runge–Lenz vector
- Newton's theorem about ovals
- Two-body problem in general relativity

== Bibliography ==
- Bertrand, J (1873). "Théorème relatif au mouvement d'un point attiré vers un centre fixe". Comptes rendus hebdomadaires des séances de l'Académie des Sciences. xxvii/10: 849–853. (séance du lundi 20 Octobre 1873)
- Brown, EW (1891). "On the Determination of a Certain Class of Inequalities in the Moon's Motion". Monthly Notices of the Royal Astronomical Society. 52 (2): 71. Bibcode:1891MNRAS..52...71B. doi:10.1093/mnras/52.2.71.
- Brown, EW (1903). "On the degree of accuracy in the new lunary theory". Monthly Notices of the Royal Astronomical Society. 64: 524–534. Bibcode:1904MNRAS..64..524.. doi:10.1093/mnras/64.6.524.
- Chandrasekhar, S (1995), Newton's Principia for the Common Reader, Oxford University Press, pp. 183–200, ISBN 978-0-19-852675-9
- Cheng, Eugenia (2023). Is Math Real? How Simple Questions Lead Us to Mathematics' Deepest Truths. Basic Books. ISBN 978-1-54-16018-26.
- Clairaut, AC (1745). "Du Système du Monde dans les principes de la gravitation universelle". Histoire de l'Académie Royale des Sciences avec les mémoires de mathématique et de physique. 1749: 329–364. Archived from the original on 2011-06-07.
- Cohen, IB (1990). "Halley's Two Essays on Newton's Principia". In Norman Thrower (ed.). Standing on the Shoulders of Giants: A Longer View of Newton and Halley. Berkeley, CA: University of California Press. pp. 91–108. ISBN 978-0-520-06589-5.
- Cohen, IB (1999). "A Guide to Newton's Principia". The Principia: Mathematical Principles of Natural Philosophy. Berkeley, CA: University of California Press. pp. 147–148, 246–252. ISBN 978-0-520-08816-0.
- Cook, A (2000). "Success and Failure in Newton's Lunar Theory". Astronomy and Geophysics. 41 (6): 21–25. Bibcode:2000A&G....41f..21C. doi:10.1046/j.1468-4004.2000.41621.x.
- Delaunay, C (1862). "Nouvelle théorie du mouvement de la Lune". Mémoires Acad. Imp. Sci.
- Delaunay, C (1860). "Théorie du mouvement de la lune". Mémoires Acad. Imp. Sci. 1.
- Delaunay, C (1867). "Théorie du mouvement de la lune". Mémoires Acad. Imp. Sci. 2.
- D'Eliseo, MM (2007). "The first-order orbital equation". American Journal of Physics. 75 (4): 352–355. arXiv:2504.13239. Bibcode:2007AmJPh..75..352D. doi:10.1119/1.2432126.
- Fitzpartrick, Richard (2012), An Introduction to Celestial Mechanics, Cambridge University Press, ISBN 978-1-107-02381-9
- Fraknoi, Andrew; et al. (2022). "2.4 The Birth of Modern Astronomy". Astronomy 2e. OpenStax. pp. 54–60. ISBN 978-1-951693-50-3.
- Grossman, Nathaniel (1996), The Sheer Joy of Celestial Mechanics, Springer Science & Business Media, ISBN 978-0-8176-3832-0
- Hall, A (1894). "A suggestion in the theory of Mercury". The Astronomical Journal. 14: 49–51. Bibcode:1894AJ.....14...49H. doi:10.1086/102055.
- Heilbron, J (2005), The Oxford Guide to the History of Physics and Astronomy, Oxford University Press, USA, Bibcode:2005oghp.book.....H, ISBN 978-0-19-517198-3
- Hill, GW (1894). "Literal expression for the motion of the moon's perigee". Ann. Math. 9 (1/6): 31–41. doi:10.2307/1967502. JSTOR 1967502.
- Hiltebeitel, AM (1911). "On the Problem of Two Fixed Centres and Certain of its Generalizations". American Journal of Mathematics. 33 (1/4). The Johns Hopkins University Press: 337–362. doi:10.2307/2369997. JSTOR 2369997.
- Horrocks, J (1673). Jeremia Horocii opera posthuma. London: G Godbit for J Martyn.
- Kollerstrom, N (2000). Newton's Forgotten Lunar Theory: His Contribution to the Quest for Longitude. Green Lion Press. ISBN 978-1-888009-08-8.
- Kunitzsch, Paul (2008). "Almagest: Its Reception and Transmission in the Islamic World". In Selin, H. (ed.). Encyclopaedia of the History of Science, Technology, and Medicine in Non-Western Cultures. Springer. pp. 140–141. doi:10.1007/978-1-4020-4425-0_8988. ISBN 978-1-4020-4425-0.
- Lambourne, Robert (2010), Relativity, Gravitation and Cosmology, Cambridge University Press, ISBN 978-0-521-13138-4
- Lawrence, J Dennis (1972), A Catalog of Special Plane Curves, New York: Dover, ISBN 0486602885
- Lynden-Bell, D; Lynden-Bell, RM (1997). "On the Shapes of Newton's Revolving Orbits". Notes and Records of the Royal Society of London. 51 (2): 195–198. doi:10.1098/rsnr.1997.0016. S2CID 73239002.
- Le Verrier, UJJ (1859). "Théorie du mouvement de Mercure". Annales de l'Observatoire Impérial de Paris. 5: 1–196, esp. 98–106. Bibcode:1859AnPar...5....1L.
- Lynden-Bell, D; Jin, S (2008). "Analytic central orbits and their transformation group". Monthly Notices of the Royal Astronomical Society. 386 (1): 245–260. arXiv:0711.3491. Bibcode:2008MNRAS.386..245L. doi:10.1111/j.1365-2966.2008.13018.x. S2CID 15451037.
- Mahomed, FM; Vawda, F (2000). "Application of Symmetries to Central Force Problems". Nonlinear Dynamics. 21 (4): 307–315. Bibcode:2000NonDy..21..307M. doi:10.1023/A:1008317327402. S2CID 116319304.
- Nemiroff, Robert (13 Jun 2010). "Retrograde Mars". Astronomy Picture of the Day. NASA. Archived from the original on 31 May 2011.
- Newcomb, Simon (1882). "Discussion and Results of Observations on Transits of Mercury from 1677 to 1881". Astronomical Papers Prepared for the Use of the American Ephemeris and Nautical Almanac. 1: 473. Bibcode:1882USNAO...1..363N.
- Newton, I (1999) [1726]. The Principia: Mathematical Principles of Natural Philosophy. Translated by I. Bernard Cohen; Anne Whitman; Julia Budenz (3rd ed.). Berkeley, CA: University of California Press. pp. 147–148, 246–264, 534–545. ISBN 978-0-520-08816-0.
- O'Connor, John J.; Robertson, Edmund F. (1999), "Apollonius of Perga", MacTutor History of Mathematics Archive, University of St Andrews
- Pars, LA (1981) [1965]. A Treatise on Analytical Dynamics. John Wiley and Sons. p. 56. ISBN 978-0-918024-07-7. LCCN 64024556.
- Roseveare, N (1982). Mercury's perihelion from Le verrier to Einstein. Oxford.
- Rouse Ball, WW (1893). An Essay on Newton's "Principia". Macmillan and Co. (reprint, Merchant Books). pp. 84–85. ISBN 978-1-60386-012-3.
- Routh, EJ (2008) [1960]. A Treatise on Dynamics of a Particle (reprint of 1898 ed.). New York: Dover Publications. pp. 230–233 (sections §356–359). ISBN 978-0-548-96521-4.
- Shikin, Eugene (1995), Handbook and Atlas of Curves, CRC Press, ISBN 978-0-8493-8963-4
- Smith, GE (1999a). "Newton and the Problem of the Moon's Motion". The Principia: Mathematical Principles of Natural Philosophy. Berkeley, CA: University of California Press. pp. 252–257. ISBN 978-0-520-08816-0.
- Smith, GE (1999b). "Motion of the Lunar Apsis". The Principia: Mathematical Principles of Natural Philosophy. Berkeley, CA: University of California Press. pp. 257–264. ISBN 978-0-520-08816-0.
- Spivak, Michael (1994). "Planetary Motion". Calculus (3rd ed.). Publish or Perish. ISBN 0-914098-89-6.
- Sugon, QM; Bragais, S; McNamara, DJ (2008), Copernicus's epicycles from Newton's gravitational force law via linear perturbation theory in geometric algebra, arXiv:0807.2708v1
- Sundman, KF (1912). "Memoire sur le probleme de trois corps". Acta Mathematica. 36 (1): 105–179. doi:10.1007/BF02422379.
- Symon, KR (1971). Mechanics (3rd ed.). Reading, MA: Addison–Wesley. ISBN 0-201-07392-7.
- Valluri, S. R.; Wilson, C.; Harper, W. (1997). "Newton's Apsidal Precession Theorem and Eccentric Orbits". Journal for the History of Astronomy. 28: 13–27. Bibcode:1997JHA....28...13V. doi:10.1177/002182869702800102. S2CID 117886193.
- van der Waerden, BL (October 1974). "The Earliest Form of the Epicycle Theory". Journal for the History of Astronomy. 5 (3): 175–185. Bibcode:1974JHA.....5..175V. doi:10.1177/002182867400500303.
- Weisstein, Eric (2002), CRC Concise Encyclopedia of Mathematics, Second Edition, CRC Press, ISBN 978-1-4200-3522-3
- Whittaker, ET (1937). A Treatise on the Analytical Dynamics of Particles and Rigid Bodies, with an Introduction to the Problem of Three Bodies (4th ed.). New York: Dover Publications. ISBN 978-0-521-35883-5.
- Wilson, C (1987). "On the Origin of Horrock's Lunar Theory". Journal for the History of Astronomy. 18 (2): 77–94. Bibcode:1987JHA....18...77W. doi:10.1177/002182868701800201. S2CID 115379870.
- Samboy, Nolan; Gallant, Joseph (2024). "A modern interpretation of Newton's theorem of revolving orbits". American Journal of Physics. 92 (5): 343–348. arXiv:2401.10944. Bibcode:2024AmJPh..92e.343S. doi:10.1119/5.0166698.
