= Cotes's spiral =

Plane curve

In physics and in the mathematics of plane curves, a Cotes's spiral (also written Cotes' spiral and Cotes spiral) is one of a family of spirals classified by Roger Cotes.

== Description ==
Cotes introduces his analysis of these curves as follows: “It is proposed to list the different types of trajectories which bodies can move along when acted on by centripetal forces in the inverse ratio of the cubes of their distances, proceeding from a given place, with given speed, and direction.” (N. b. he does not describe them as spirals).

Cotes spirals corresponding to k equal to 2/3 (red), 1.0 (black), 1.5 (green), 3.0 (cyan) and 6.0 (blue)

The shape of spirals in the family depends on the parameters. The curves in polar coordinates, (r, θ), r > 0 are defined by one of the following five equations:

$$\frac{1}{r} =
\begin{cases}
A \cosh(k\theta + \varepsilon) \\
A \exp(k\theta + \varepsilon) \\
A \sinh(k\theta + \varepsilon) \\
A (k\theta + \varepsilon) \\
A \cos(k\theta + \varepsilon) \\
\end{cases}$$

A > 0, k > 0 and ε are arbitrary real number constants. A determines the size, k determines the shape, and ε determines the angular position of the spiral.

Cotes referred to the different forms as "cases". The equations of the curves above correspond respectively to his 5 cases.

The Diagram shows representative examples of the different curves. The centre is marked by ‘O’ and the radius from O to the curve is shown when θ is zero. The value of ε is zero unless shown.

The first and third forms are Poinsot's spirals; the second is the equiangular spiral; the fourth is the hyperbolic spiral; the fifth is the epispiral.

For more information about their properties, reference should be made to the individual curves.

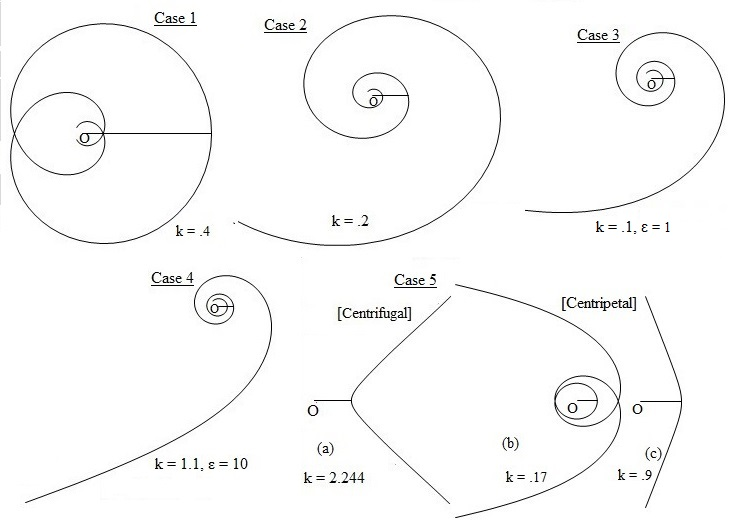

== Classical mechanics ==
Cotes's spirals appear in classical mechanics, as the family of solutions for the motion of a particle moving under an inverse-cube central force. Consider a central force

$$\boldsymbol{F}(\boldsymbol{r}) = -\frac{\mu}{r^3}\hat\boldsymbol{r},$$

where μ is the strength of attraction. Consider a particle moving under the influence of the central force, and let h be its specific angular momentum, then the particle moves along a Cotes's spiral, with the constant k of the spiral given by

$$k = \sqrt{1 - \frac{\mu}{h^2}}$$

when μ < h^{2} (cosine form of the spiral), or

$$k = \sqrt{\frac{\mu}{h^2} - 1}$$

when μ > h^{2}, Poinsot form of the spiral. When μ = h^{2}, the particle follows a hyperbolic spiral. The derivation can be found in the references.

== History ==
In the Harmonia Mensurarum (1722), Roger Cotes analysed a number of spirals and other curves, such as the Lituus. He described the possible trajectories of a particle in an inverse-cube central force field, which are the Cotes's spirals. The analysis is based on the method in the Principia Book 1, Proposition 42, where the path of a body is determined under an arbitrary central force, initial speed, and direction.

Depending on the initial speed and direction he determines that there are 5 different "cases" (excluding the trivial ones, the circle and straight line through the centre).

He notes that of the 5, "the first and the last are described by Newton, by means of the quadrature (i.e. integration) of the hyperbola and the ellipse".

Case 2 is the equiangular spiral, which is the spiral par excellence. This has great historical significance as in Proposition 9 of the Principia Book 1, Newton proves that if a body moves along an equiangular spiral, under the action of a central force, that force must be as the inverse of the cube of the radius (even before his proof, in Proposition 11, that motion in an ellipse directed to a focus requires an inverse-square force).

It has to be admitted that not all the curves conform to the usual definition of a spiral. For example, when the inverse-cube force is centrifugal (directed outwards), so that μ < 0, the curve does not even rotate once about the centre. This is represented by case 5, the first of the polar equations shown above, with k > 1 in this case.

Samuel Earnshaw in a book published in 1826 used the term “Cotes’ spirals”, so the terminology was in use at that time. Earnshaw clearly describes Cotes's 5 cases and unnecessarily adds a 6th, which is when the force is centrifugal (repulsive). As noted above, Cotes's included this with case 5.

Following E. T. Whittaker, whose A Treatise on the Analytical Dynamics of Particles and Rigid Bodies (first published in 1904) only listed three of Cotes's spirals, some subsequent authors have followed suit.

== See also ==
- Archimedean spiral – Spiral with constant distance from itself
- Logarithmic spiral – Self-similar growth curve
- Hyperbolic spiral – Spiral asymptotic to a line
- Newton's theorem of revolving orbits – Theorem in classical mechanics
- Bertrand's theorem – Physics theorem

== Bibliography ==
- Whittaker, E. T. (1927). A Treatise on the Analytical Dynamics of Particles and Rigid Bodies, with an Introduction to the Problem of Three Bodies (3rd ed.). Cambridge University Press. pp. 80–83.
- Roger Cotes (1722) Harmonia Mensuarum, pp. 31, 98.
- Isaac Newton (1687) Philosophiæ Naturalis Principia Mathematica, Book I, §2, Proposition 9, and §8, Proposition 42, Corollary 3, and §9, Proposition 43, Corollary 6
- Danby JM (1988). "The Case ƒ(r) = μ/r^{3} — Cotes' Spiral (§4.7)". Fundamentals of Celestial Mechanics (2nd ed., rev. ed.). Richmond, VA: Willmann-Bell. pp. 69–71. ISBN 978-0-943396-20-0.
- Symon KR (1971). Mechanics (3rd ed.). Reading, MA: Addison-Wesley. p. 154. ISBN 978-0-201-07392-8.
- Samuel Earnshaw (1832). Dynamics, Or an Elementary Treatise on Motion and a Short Treatise on Attractions (1st ed.). J. & J. J. Deighton; and Whittaker, Treacher & Arnot. p. 47.
- Kelley, J. Daniel; Leventhal, Jacob J. (November 2016). "Central Forces and Orbits". Problems in Classical and Quantum Mechanics. Springer International Publishing. pp. 67–94. doi:10.1007/978-3-319-46664-4_3. ISBN 9783319466644.
