= Bertrand's paradox =

Bertrand's paradox or Bertrand paradox may refer to one of three paradoxes by Joseph Bertrand:

- Bertrand paradox (economics)
- Bertrand paradox (probability)
- Bertrand's box paradox
