= Roger Cotes =

English mathematician (1682–1716)

Roger Cotes FRS
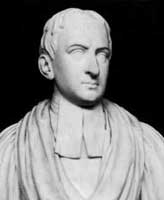
- This bust was commissioned by Robert Smith and sculpted posthumously by Peter Scheemakers in 1758.
- Born: 10 July 1682; Burbage, Leicestershire, England
- Died: 5 June 1716 (aged 33); Cambridge, Cambridgeshire, England
- Education: Trinity College, Cambridge
- Known for: Lituus spiral Logarithmic spiral Least squares Euler's formula proof Concept of the radian Cotes spiral Newton–Cotes formulas
- Scientific career
- Fields: Mathematician
- Workplaces: Trinity College, Cambridge
- Academic advisors: Richard Bentley; Isaac Newton
- Notable students: Stephen Gray; James Jurin; Robert Smith

Roger Cotes (10 July 1682 – 5 June 1716) was an English mathematician, known for working closely with Isaac Newton by proofreading the second edition of his famous book, the Principia, before publication. He also devised the quadrature formulas known as Newton–Cotes formulas, which originated from Newton's research, and made a geometric argument that can be interpreted as a logarithmic version of Euler's formula. He was the first Plumian Professor at Cambridge University from 1707 until his death.

== Early life ==
Cotes was born in Burbage, Leicestershire. His parents were Robert, the rector of Burbage, and his wife, Grace, née Farmer. Roger had an elder brother, Anthony (born 1681), and a younger sister, Susanna (born 1683), both of whom died young. At first Roger attended Leicester School, where his mathematical talent was recognised. His aunt Hannah had married Rev. John Smith, and Smith took on the role of tutor to encourage Roger's talent. The Smiths' son, Robert Smith, became a close associate of Roger Cotes throughout his life. Cotes later studied at St Paul's School in London and entered Trinity College, Cambridge, in 1699. He graduated BA in 1702 and MA in 1706.

== Astronomy ==
Roger Cotes's contributions to modern computational methods lie heavily in the fields of astronomy and mathematics. Cotes began his educational career with a focus on astronomy. He became a fellow of Trinity College in 1707, and at age 26 he became the first Plumian Professor of Astronomy and Experimental Philosophy. On his appointment to professor, he opened a subscription list in an effort to provide an observatory for Trinity. Unfortunately, the observatory was still unfinished when Cotes died, and was demolished in 1797.

In correspondence with Isaac Newton, Cotes designed a heliostat telescope with a mirror revolving by clockwork. He recomputed the solar and planetary tables of Giovanni Domenico Cassini and John Flamsteed, and he intended to create tables of the moon's motion, based on Newtonian principles. Finally, in 1707 he formed a school of physical sciences at Trinity in partnership with William Whiston.

== The Principia ==
From 1709 to 1713, Cotes became heavily involved with the second edition of Newton's Principia, a book that explained Newton's theory of universal gravitation. The first edition of Principia had only a few copies printed and was in need of revision to include Newton's works and principles of lunar and planetary theory. Newton at first had a casual approach to the revision, since he had all but given up scientific work. However, through the vigorous passion displayed by Cotes, Newton's scientific hunger was once again reignited. The two spent nearly three and half years collaborating on the work, in which they fully deduce, from Newton's laws of motion, the theory of the moon, the equinoxes, and the orbits of comets. Only 750 copies of the second edition were printed although pirated copies from Amsterdam were also distributed to meet the demand for the work. As a reward to Cotes, he was given a share of the profits and 12 copies of his own. Cotes's original contribution to the work was a preface which supported the scientific superiority of Newton's principles over the then popular vortex theory of gravity advocated by René Descartes. Cotes concluded that the Newton's law of gravitation was confirmed by observation of celestial phenomena that were inconsistent with the vortex theory.

== Mathematics ==
Cotes's major original work was in mathematics, especially in the fields of integral calculus, logarithms, and numerical analysis. He published only one scientific paper in his lifetime, titled Logometria, in which he successfully constructs the logarithmic spiral. After his death, many of Cotes's mathematical papers were edited by his cousin Robert Smith and published in a book, Harmonia mensurarum. Cotes's additional works were later published in Thomas Simpson's The Doctrine and Application of Fluxions. Although Cotes's style was somewhat obscure, his systematic approach to integration and mathematical theory was highly regarded by his peers. Cotes discovered an important theorem on the n-th roots of unity, foresaw the method of least squares, and discovered a method for integrating rational fractions with binomial denominators. He was also praised for his efforts in numerical methods, especially in interpolation methods and his table construction techniques. He was regarded as one of the few British mathematicians capable of following the powerful work of Sir Isaac Newton.

== Death and assessment ==
Cotes died from a violent fever in Cambridge in 1716 at the early age of 33. Isaac Newton remarked, "If he had lived we would have known something."

== See also ==
- Cotes's spiral
- Extended Euclidean algorithm
- Newton–Cotes formulas
- Lituus (mathematics)

== Sources ==
- [Anon.] "Cotes, Roger" . Encyclopædia Britannica. Vol. 7 (11th ed.). 1911.
- Cohen, I. B. (1971). Introduction to Newton's "Principia". Harvard: Harvard University Press. ISBN 0-674-46193-2.
- Edleston, J., ed. (1850). Correspondence of Sir Isaac Newton and Professor Cotes. via Internet Archive
- Gowing, R. (2002). Roger Cotes: Natural Philosopher. London: Cambridge University Press. ISBN 0-521-52649-3.
- Koyré, A. (1965). Newtonian Studies. London: Chapman & Hall. pp. 273–82. ISBN 0-412-42300-6.
- Price, D. J. (1952). "The early observatory instruments of Trinity College, Cambridge". Annals of Science. 8: 1–12. doi:10.1080/00033795200200012.
- Turnbull, H. W.; et al. (1975–1976). The Correspondence of Isaac Newton (7 vols ed.). London: Cambridge University Press. vols.5–6.
- Whitman, A., ed. (1972). Isaac Newton's Philosophiae Naturalis Principia Mathematica: The Third Edition (1726) with Variant Readings. London: Cambridge University Press. pp. 817–26. ISBN 0-521-07960-8.
