= Joseph Bertrand =

French mathematician and historian (1822–1900)

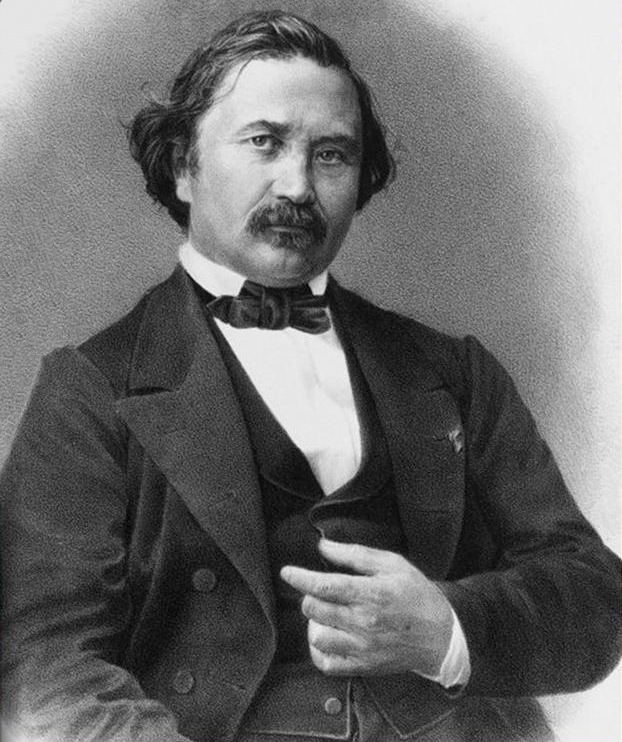
- Born: Joseph Louis François Bertrand; 11 March 1822; Paris, France
- Died: 5 April 1900 (aged 78); Paris, France
- Education: École polytechnique
- Known for: Bertrand curve Bertrand's ballot theorem Bertrand's box paradox Bertrand paradox (economics); Bertrand paradox (probability); Bertrand's postulate Bertrand's theorem Bertrand–Edgeworth model Bertrand series
- Scientific career
- Fields: Mathematics
- Workplaces: École polytechnique Collège de France
- Thesis: Sur la théorie des phénomènes thermo-mécaniques (1838)

Joseph Louis François Bertrand (French pronunciation: [ʒozɛf lwi fʁɑ̃swa bɛʁtʁɑ̃]; 11 March 1822 – 5 April 1900) was a French mathematician and historian of science whose work emphasized number theory, differential geometry, probability theory, economics and thermodynamics.

He lends his name to various paradoxes in mathematics and economics—Bertrand's paradoxes— and to Bertrand's theorem on the stability of celestial orbits.

== Biography ==
Joseph Bertrand was the son of physician Alexandre Jacques François Bertrand and the brother of archaeologist Alexandre Bertrand. His father died when Joseph was only nine years old; by that time he had learned a substantial amount of mathematics and could speak Latin fluently. At eleven years old he attended the course of the École polytechnique as an auditor. From age eleven to seventeen, he obtained two bachelor's degrees, a license and a PhD with a thesis concerning the mathematical theory of electricity, and was admitted to the 1839 entrance examination of the École polytechnique. Bertrand was a professor at the École polytechnique and Collège de France, and was a member of the Paris Academy of Sciences of which he was the permanent secretary for twenty-six years.

In 1858 he was elected a foreign member of the Royal Swedish Academy of Sciences.

== Work ==
He conjectured, in 1845, that there is at least one prime number between n and 2n − 2 for every n > 3. Chebyshev proved this conjecture, now termed Bertrand's postulate, in 1850. He was also famous for two paradoxes of probability, known now as Bertrand's paradox and the Paradox of Bertrand's box. There is another paradox concerning game theory that is named for him, known as the Bertrand paradox. In 1849, he was the first to define real numbers using what is now termed a Dedekind cut.

Bertrand translated into French Carl Friedrich Gauss's work concerning the theory of errors and the method of least squares in 1855, with Gauss's approval.

Concerning economics, he reviewed the work on oligopoly theory, specifically the Cournot Competition Model (1838) of French mathematician Antoine Augustin Cournot. His Bertrand Competition Model (1883) argued that Cournot had reached a very misleading conclusion, and he reworked it using prices rather than quantities as the strategic variables, thus showing that the equilibrium price was simply the competitive price.

His 1887 book Thermodynamique states in Chapter XII, that thermodynamic entropy and temperature are only defined for reversible processes. He was one of the first people to state this publicly.

== Works by Bertrand ==
- Traité de calcul différentiel et de calcul intégral (Paris : Gauthier-Villars, 1864–1870) (2 volumes treatise on calculus)
- Rapport sur les progrès les plus récents de l'analyse mathématique (Paris: Imprimerie Impériale, 1867) (report on recent progress in mathematical analysis)
- Traité d'arithmétique (L. Hachette, 1849) (arithmetics)
- Thermodynamique (Paris : Gauthier-Villars, 1887)
- Méthode des moindres carrés (Mallet-Bachelier, 1855) (translation of Gauss's work on least squares)
- Leçons sur la théorie mathématique de l'électricité / professées au Collège de France (Paris : Gauthier-Villars et fils, 1890)
- Calcul des probabilités (Paris : Gauthier-Villars et fils, 1889)
- Arago et sa vie scientifique (Paris : J. Hetzel, 1865) (biography of Arago)
- Blaise Pascal (Paris : C. Lévy, 1891) (biography)
- Les fondateurs de l'astronomie moderne: Copernic, Tycho Brahé, Képler, Galilée, Newton (Paris: J. Hetzel, 1865) (biographies)

== Legacy ==
In Barcelona, a street in the Sarrià–Sant Gervasi district is named Carrer de Josep Bertrand after Joseph Bertrand, reflecting recognition of his legacy beyond France. The name of the street was officially approved on 16 May 1939 and appears in the official Barcelona street nomenclature, where the Catalan form “Josep” is used instead of the Spanish “José”. Earlier or alternative Spanish-language references to the street use the spelling José Bertrand, but the current official name follows standard Catalan orthography. Carrer de Josep Bertrand runs through the 08021 postal district and commemorates his contributions by preserving his name in the urban landscape of Barcelona.

== See also ==
- Bertrand paradox (probability) – Probability theory paradox
- Bertrand paradox (economics) – Paradox in economics
- Bertrand's box paradox – Mathematical paradox
- Bertrand's postulate – Result on density of prime numbers
- Bertrand's theorem – Physics theorem
- Bertrand's ballot theorem – Election result probability theorem
- Bertrand–Edgeworth model – Economic Model
- Bertrand curve
- Buckingham π theorem – Theorem in dimensional analysis
- Bertrand series
