= Bertrand's box paradox =

Mathematical paradox

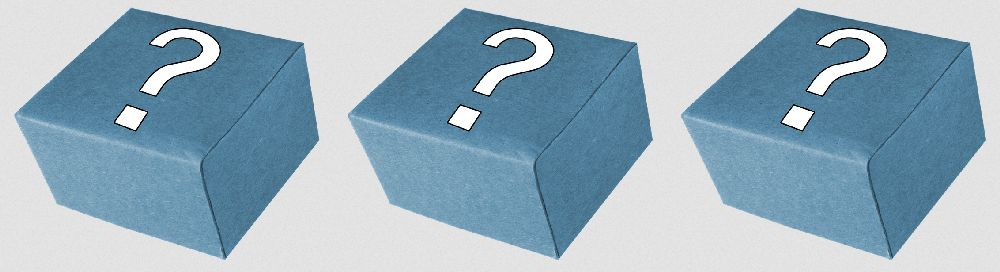
The paradox starts with three boxes, the contents of which are initially unknown

Bertrand's box paradox is a veridical paradox in elementary probability theory. It was first posed by Joseph Bertrand in his 1889 work Calcul des Probabilités.

There are three boxes:

1. a box containing two gold coins,
2. a box containing two silver coins,
3. a box containing one gold coin and one silver coin.

A coin withdrawn at random from one of the three boxes happens to be a gold. What is the probability the other coin from the same box will also be a gold coin?

A veridical paradox is a paradox whose correct solution seems to be counterintuitive. It may seem intuitive that the probability that the remaining coin is gold should be 1/2, but the probability is actually 2/3. Bertrand showed that if 1/2 were correct, it would result in a contradiction, so 1/2 cannot be correct.

This simple but counterintuitive puzzle is used as a standard example in teaching probability theory. The solution illustrates some basic principles, including the Kolmogorov axioms.

== Solution ==
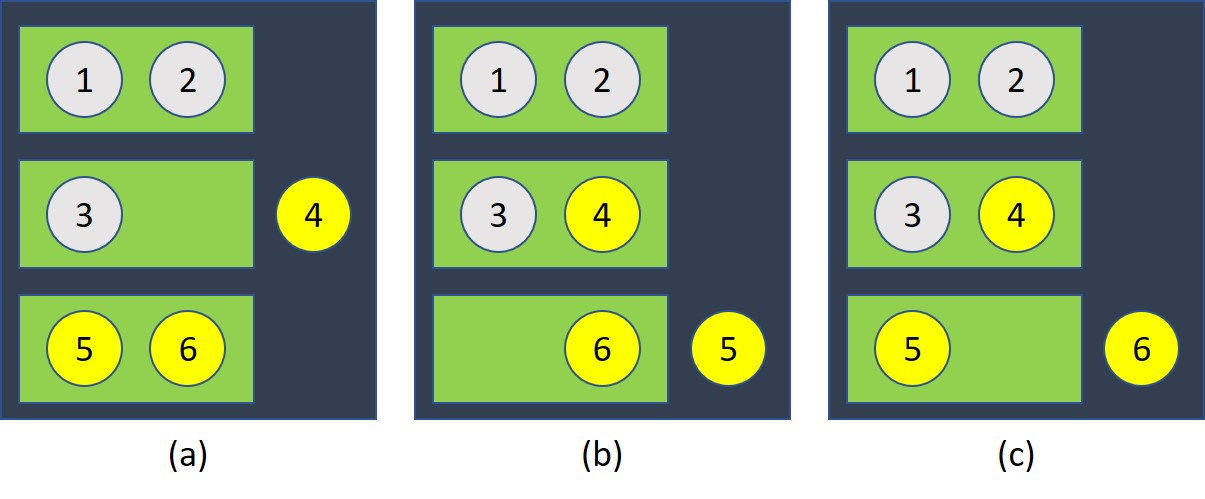
Bertrand's box paradox: the three equally probable outcomes after the first gold coin draw. The probability of drawing another gold coin from the same box is 0 in (a), and 1 in (b) and (c). Thus, the overall probability of drawing a gold coin in the second draw is 0/3 + 1/3 + 1/3 = 2/3.

The problem can be reframed by describing the boxes as each having one drawer on each of two sides. Each drawer contains a coin. One box has a gold coin on each side (GG), one a silver coin on each side (SS), and the other a gold coin on one side and a silver coin on the other (GS). A box is chosen at random, a random drawer is opened, and a gold coin is found inside it. What is the chance of the coin on the other side being gold?

The following reasoning appears to give a probability of 1/2:

- Originally, all three boxes were equally likely to be chosen.
- The chosen box cannot be box SS.
- So it must be box GG or GS.
- The two remaining possibilities are equally likely. So the probability that the box is GG, and the other coin is also gold, is 1/2.

The reasoning for the 2/3 is as follows:

- Originally, all six coins were equally likely to be chosen.
- The chosen coin cannot be from drawer S of box GS, or from either drawer of box SS.
- So it must come from the G drawer of box GS, or either drawer of box GG.
- The three remaining possibilities are equally likely, so the probability that the drawer is from box GG is 2/3.

Bertrand's purpose for constructing this example was to show that merely counting cases is not always proper. Instead, one should sum the probabilities that the cases would produce the observed result.

== Experimental data ==
Why 2/3, not 1/2: count the coins

Boxes: 📦1 🟡🟡 📦2 🟡⚪ 📦3 ⚪⚪. You draw one of the six coins, each equally likely; three of them are gold.

If you drew	It came from	The other coin is
🟡 gold coin 1	box 1 (🟡🟡)	🟡 gold
🟡 gold coin 2	box 1 (🟡🟡)	🟡 gold
🟡 gold coin 3	box 2 (🟡⚪)	⚪ silver
⚪ any silver coin	box 2 or 3	set aside — the question assumes a gold draw

Of the three equally likely gold coins you might be holding, two sit beside another gold coin: the other coin is gold with probability 2/3, not 1/2. An interactive version of this demonstration is available with JavaScript enabled.

A survey of psychology freshmen taking an introductory probability course was conducted to assess their solutions to the similar three-card problem. In the three-card problem, three cards are placed into a hat. One card is red on both sides, one is white on both sides, and one is white on one side and red on the other. If a card pulled from the hat is red on one side, the probability of the other side also being red is 2/3.

53 students participated and were asked what the probability of the other side being red were. 35 incorrectly responded with 1/2; only 3 students correctly responded with 2/3.

== Related problems ==
Other veridical paradoxes of probability include:

- the boy or girl paradox
- the Monty Hall problem
- the three prisoners problem
- the two envelopes problem
- the Sleeping Beauty problem

The Monty Hall and Three Prisoners problems are identical mathematically to Bertrand's Box paradox. The construction of the Boy or Girl paradox is similar, essentially adding a fourth box with a gold coin and a silver coin. Its answer is controversial, based on how one assumes the "drawer" was chosen.
