= Poinsot's spirals =

Two spirals represented by polar equations

In mathematics, Poinsot's spirals are two spirals represented by the polar equations

$$r = a\ \operatorname{csch} (n\theta)$$
$$r = a\ \operatorname{sech} (n\theta)$$

where csch is the hyperbolic cosecant, and sech is the hyperbolic secant. They are named after the French mathematician Louis Poinsot.

== Examples of the two types of Poinsot's spirals ==
The Poinsot spiral r=csch(θ/3).

The Poinsot spiral r=sech(θ/3).

== See also ==
- Cotes's spiral – Plane curve
