= Epispiral =

Type of plane curve

An epispiral with equation r(θ)=2sec(2θ)

The epispiral is a plane curve with polar equation

$$\ r=a \sec{n\theta}$$.

There are n sections if n is odd and 2n if n is even.

It is the polar or circle inversion of the rose curve.

In astronomy the epispiral is related to the equations that explain planets' orbits.

== Alternative definition ==
There is another definition of the epispiral that has to do with tangents to circles:

Begin with a circle.

Rotate some single point on the circle around the circle by some angle $\theta$ and at the same time by an angle in constant proportion to $\theta$, say $c\theta$ for some constant $c$.

The intersections of the tangent lines to the circle at these new points rotated from that single point for every $\theta$ would trace out an epispiral.

The polar equation can be derived through simple geometry as follows:

To determine the polar coordinates $(\rho,\phi)$ of the intersection of the tangent lines in question for some $\theta$ and $-1<c<1$, note that $\phi$ is halfway between $\theta$ and $c\theta$ by congruence of triangles, so it is $\frac{(c+1)\theta}{2}$. Moreover, if the radius of the circle generating the curve is $r$, then since there is a right-angled triangle (it's right-angled as a tangent to a circle meets the radius at a right angle at the point of tangency) with hypotenuse $\rho$ and an angle $\frac{(1-c) \theta}{2}$ to which the adjacent leg of the triangle is $r$, the radius $\rho$ at the intersection point of the relevant tangents is $r\sec(\frac{(1-c)\theta}{2})$. This gives the polar equation of the curve, $\rho=r\sec(\frac{(1-c)\phi}{c+1})$ for all points $(\rho,\phi)$ on it.

== See also ==
- Logarithmic spiral
- Rose (mathematics)
