= Central force =

Mechanical force towards or away from a point

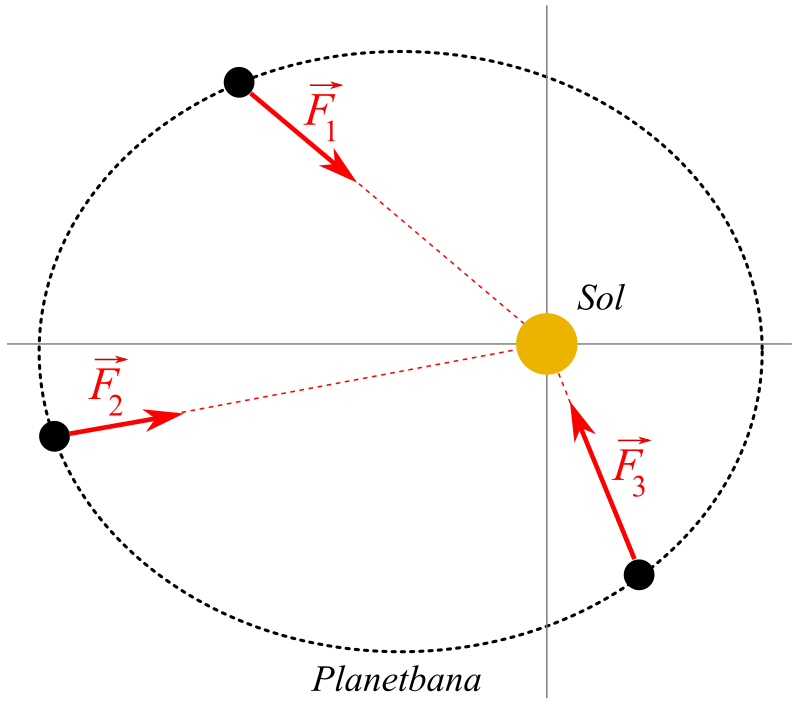
A diagram of Central forces

In classical mechanics, a central force on an object is a force that is directed towards or away from a point called center of force.
$$\mathbf{F}(\mathbf{r}) = F( \mathbf{r} ) {\hat{\mathbf{r}}}$$
where $\mathbf{F}$ is a force vector, $F$ is a scalar valued force function (whose absolute value gives the magnitude of the force and is positive if the force is outward and negative if the force is inward), $\mathbf{r}$ is the position vector, $\|\mathbf{r}\|$ is its length, and $\hat{\mathbf{r}} = \mathbf r / \|\mathbf r\|$ is the corresponding unit vector.

Not all central force fields are conservative or spherically symmetric. However, a central force is conservative if and only if it is spherically symmetric or rotationally invariant. Examples of spherically symmetric central forces include the Coulomb force and the force of gravity.

== Properties ==
Central forces that are conservative can always be expressed as the negative gradient of a potential energy:
$$\mathbf{F}(\mathbf{r}) = - \mathbf{\nabla} V(\mathbf{r}) \; \text{, where } V(\mathbf{r}) = \int_{|\mathbf{r}|}^{+\infin} F(r)\,\mathrm{d}r$$
(the upper bound of integration is arbitrary, as the potential is defined up to an additive constant).

In a conservative field, the total mechanical energy (kinetic and potential) is conserved:
$$E = \tfrac{1}{2} m |\mathbf{\dot{r}}|^2 + \tfrac{1}{2} I |\boldsymbol{\omega}|^2 + V(\mathbf{r}) = \text{constant}$$
(where $\dot{r}$ denotes the derivative of $r$ with respect to time, that is the velocity, $I$ denotes moment of inertia of that body and $\omega$ denotes angular velocity), and in a central force field, so is the angular momentum:
$$\mathbf{L} = \mathbf{r} \times m\mathbf{\dot{r}} = \text{constant}$$
because the torque exerted by the force is zero. As a consequence, the body moves on the plane perpendicular to the angular momentum vector and containing the origin, and obeys Kepler's second law. (If the angular momentum is zero, the body moves along the line joining it with the origin.)

It can also be shown that an object that moves under the influence of any central force obeys Kepler's second law. However, the first and third laws depend on the inverse-square nature of Newton's law of universal gravitation and do not hold in general for other central forces.

As a consequence of being conservative, these specific central force fields are irrotational, that is, its curl is zero, except at the origin:
$$\nabla\times\mathbf{F} (\mathbf{r}) = \mathbf{0} .$$

== Examples ==
Gravitational force and Coulomb force are two familiar examples with $F( \mathbf{r} )$ being proportional to 1/r^{2} only. An object in such a force field with negative $F( \mathbf{r} )$ (corresponding to an attractive force) obeys Kepler's laws of planetary motion.

The force field of a spatial harmonic oscillator is central with $F( \mathbf{r} )$ proportional to r only and negative.

By Bertrand's theorem, these two, $F( \mathbf{r} ) = -k/r^2$and $F( \mathbf{r} ) = -kr$, are the only possible central force fields where all bounded orbits are stable closed orbits. However, there exist other force fields, which have some closed orbits.

== See also ==
- Classical central-force problem
- Particle in a spherically symmetric potential
