= Jacob Hermann =

Jacob Hermann may refer to:

- Jacob Hermann (mathematician), (1678–1733)
- Jacob Herrmann, German rugby union international
- Jacobus Arminius (1560–1609), Latinized name for Jacob Harmensz / Hermann

== See also ==
- Jakob Hermann (1678–1733), Swiss mathematician
- Jacob Hermann (designer) (1910-1995), Danish cabinetmaker and furniture designer
- Jakob Herrmann (born 1987), Austrian ski mountaineer and paraglider pilot
