= Argument of periapsis =

Specifies the orbit of an object in space

Fig. 1: Diagram of orbital elements, including the argument of periapsis (ω).

The argument of periapsis (also called argument of perifocus or argument of pericenter), symbolized as ω (omega), is one of the orbital elements of an orbiting body. Parametrically, ω is the angle from the body's ascending node to its periapsis, measured in the direction of motion.

For specific types of orbits, terms such as argument of perihelion (for heliocentric orbits), argument of perigee (for geocentric orbits), argument of periastron (for orbits around stars), and so on, may be used (see apsis for more information).

An argument of periapsis of 0° means that the orbiting body will be at its closest approach to the central body at the same moment that it crosses the plane of reference from South to North. An argument of periapsis of 90° means that the orbiting body will reach periapsis at its northmost distance from the plane of reference.

Adding the argument of periapsis to the longitude of the ascending node gives the longitude of the periapsis. However, especially in discussions of binary stars and exoplanets, the terms "longitude of periapsis" or "longitude of periastron" are often used synonymously with "argument of periapsis".

== Calculation ==
In astrodynamics the argument of periapsis ω can be calculated as follows:

$\omega = \arccos{{\mathbf{n} \cdot \mathbf{e}} \over {\mathbf{\left| n \right|} \mathbf{\left| e \right|}}}$

If e_{z} < 0 then ω → 2π − ω.

where:

- n is a vector pointing towards the ascending node (i.e. the z-component of n is zero),
- e is the eccentricity vector (a vector pointing towards the periapsis).

In the case of equatorial orbits (which have no ascending node), the argument is strictly undefined. However, if the convention of setting the longitude of the ascending node Ω to 0 is followed, then the value of ω follows from the two-dimensional case: $\omega = \mathrm{atan2}\left(e_y, e_x\right)$

If the orbit is clockwise (i.e. (r × v)_{z} < 0) then ω → 2π − ω.

where:

- e_{x} and e_{y} are the x- and y-components of the eccentricity vector e.

In the case of circular orbits it is often assumed that the periapsis is placed at the ascending node and therefore ω = 0. However, in the professional exoplanet community, ω = 90° is more often assumed for circular orbits, which has the advantage that the time of a planet's inferior conjunction (which would be the time the planet would transit if the geometry were favorable) is equal to the time of its periastron.

== See also ==
- Apsidal precession
- Kepler orbit
- Orbital mechanics
- Orbital node
