= Jakob Hermann =

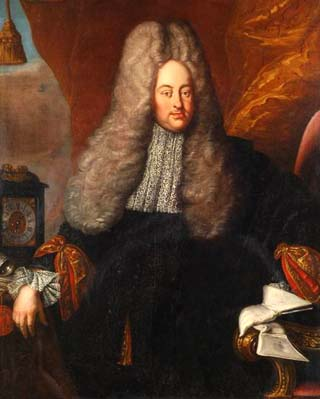
- Born: July 16, 1678; Basel, Switzerland
- Died: July 11, 1733 (aged 54); Basel, Switzerland

Jakob Hermann (16 July 1678 – 11 July 1733) was a mathematician who worked on problems in classical mechanics. He is the author of Phoronomia, an early treatise on mechanics in Latin, which has been translated by Ian Bruce in 2015-16. In 1729, he proclaimed that it was as easy to graph a locus on the polar coordinate system as it was to graph it on the Cartesian coordinate system.

He appears to have been the first to show that the Laplace–Runge–Lenz vector is a constant of motion for particles acted upon by an inverse-square central force.

Hermann was born and died in Basel. He received his mathematical training from Jacob Bernoulli at the University of Basel and graduated with a degree in 1695. In 1696, he obtained a Master's Degree by defending a dissertation on infinite series. Jacob Bernoulli considered Hermann to be the best of his many students at the university and when Jacob Bernoulli died in 1705, Gottfried Leibniz asked Hermann to write an obituary for Bernoulli in Acta Eruditorum. He became a member of the Berlin Academy in 1701. He was appointed to a chair in mathematics in Padua in 1707, but moved to Frankfurt an der Oder in 1713, and thence to St. Petersburg in 1724. In St.Petersburg, he worked closely together with Daniel Bernoulli who succeeded him in his post as he returned to Basel in 1731 to take a chair in ethics and natural law.

Hermann was elected to the Académie Royale des Sciences (Paris) in 1733, the year of his death.

Hermann was a second cousin of Leonhard Euler's mother.

== Works ==
- Phoronomia, sive De viribus et motibus corporum solidorum et fluidorum libri duo (in Latin). Amsterdam: Rudolf Wetstein & Gerard Wetstein. 1716.
