= Generating function (physics) =

Function used to generate other functions

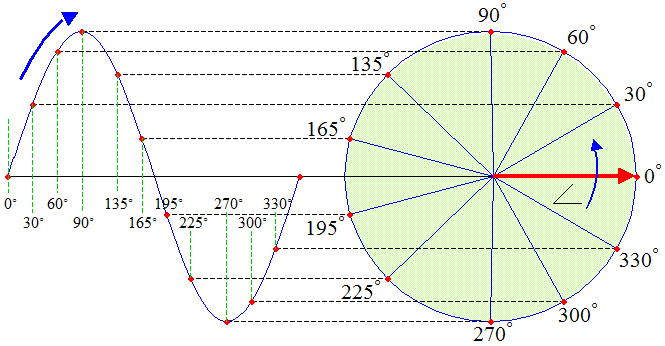
Generating a sine from a circle.

In physics, and more specifically in Hamiltonian mechanics, a generating function is, loosely, a function whose partial derivatives generate the differential equations that determine a system's dynamics. Common examples are the partition function of statistical mechanics, the Hamiltonian, and the function which acts as a bridge between two sets of canonical variables when performing a canonical transformation.

== In canonical transformations ==
There are four basic generating functions, summarized by the following table:

Generating function	Its derivatives
$F = F_1(q, Q, t)$	$p = ~~\frac{\partial F_1}{\partial q} \,\!$ and $P = - \frac{\partial F_1}{\partial Q} \,\!$
$$\begin{align} F &= F_2(q, P, t) \\ &= F_1 + QP \end{align}$$	$p = ~~\frac{\partial F_2}{\partial q} \,\!$ and $Q = ~~\frac{\partial F_2}{\partial P} \,\!$
$$\begin{align} F &= F_3(p, Q, t) \\ &= F_1 - qp \end{align}$$	$q = - \frac{\partial F_3}{\partial p} \,\!$ and $P = - \frac{\partial F_3}{\partial Q} \,\!$
$$\begin{align} F &= F_4(p, P, t) \\ &= F_1 - qp + QP \end{align}$$	$q = - \frac{\partial F_4}{\partial p} \,\!$ and $Q = ~~\frac{\partial F_4}{\partial P} \,\!$

== Example ==
Sometimes a given Hamiltonian can be turned into one that looks like the harmonic oscillator Hamiltonian, which is

$$H = aP^2 + bQ^2.$$

For example, with the Hamiltonian

$$H = \frac{1}{2q^2} + \frac{p^2 q^4}{2},$$

where p is the generalized momentum and q is the generalized coordinate, a good canonical transformation to choose would be

$$P = pq^2 \text{ and }Q = \frac{-1}{q}.$$	1

This turns the Hamiltonian into

$$H = \frac{Q^2}{2} + \frac{P^2}{2},$$

which is in the form of the harmonic oscillator Hamiltonian.

The generating function F for this transformation is of the third kind,

$$F = F_3(p,Q).$$

To find F explicitly, use the equation for its derivative from the table above,

$$P = - \frac{\partial F_3}{\partial Q},$$

and substitute the expression for P from equation (1), expressed in terms of p and Q:

$$\frac{p}{Q^2} = - \frac{\partial F_3}{\partial Q}$$

Integrating this with respect to Q results in an equation for the generating function of the transformation given by equation (1):

$F_3(p,Q) = \frac{p}{Q}$

To confirm that this is the correct generating function, verify that it matches (1):

$$q = - \frac{\partial F_3}{\partial p} = \frac{-1}{Q}$$

== See also ==
- Hamilton–Jacobi equation
- Poisson bracket
