= Jacob Hermann (designer) =

Danish furniture designer and artist (1910–1995)

- Born: 6 August 1910; Viborg Vestermark, Denmark
- Died: 20 May 1995 (aged 84); Husby, Denmark
- Occupations: Cabinetmaker, furniture designer, artist, teacher

Jacob Hermann (6 August 1910 – 20 May 1995) was a Danish cabinetmaker, furniture designer and artist. Trained as a cabinetmaker and furniture designer, Hermann worked in Copenhagen before returning to Jutland in 1950. His work ranged from furniture made in collaboration with cabinetmakers to later one-off pieces and sculptures that emphasized the natural form and character of wood.

== Early life and education ==
Hermann was born on August 6, 1910, in Viborg, Denmark where he also trained as a cabinetmaker. He subsequently studied furniture design and painting at the Danmarks Designskole in Copenhagen.

During his early career he made furniture for Danish architect and furniture designer Ole Wanscher.

== Career ==
Hermann was associated with the tradition of cabinetmaker-produced Danish furniture. A Hermann sewing cabinet from 1948 bears a handwritten label for the Cabinetmakers' Guild exhibition signed by Hermann and dated 1948.

Hermann returned to Jutland in 1950 and moved to Husby on the west coast of Jutland in 1965. In his later work he increasingly produced unique furniture and sculpture rather than furniture intended for serial production. His furniture of the 1960s and 1970s often retained irregularities in the timber and incorporated conspicuous joinery, while his sculptural work included carved and found pieces of driftwood.

== Death and legacy ==
Hermann remained comparatively little known outside specialist circles during his lifetime and for much of the period following his death. He died in Husby on 20 May 1995, aged 84.

In 2018, Antiques Trade Gazette published a feature on renewed interest in his furniture following the appearance of a group of his works at auction. A substantial profile of Hermann and his career appeared the following year in the Danish magazine Antik & Auktion.
