= Juan Perón =

President of Argentina (1946–1955, 1973–1974)

Lieutenant General Juan Perón
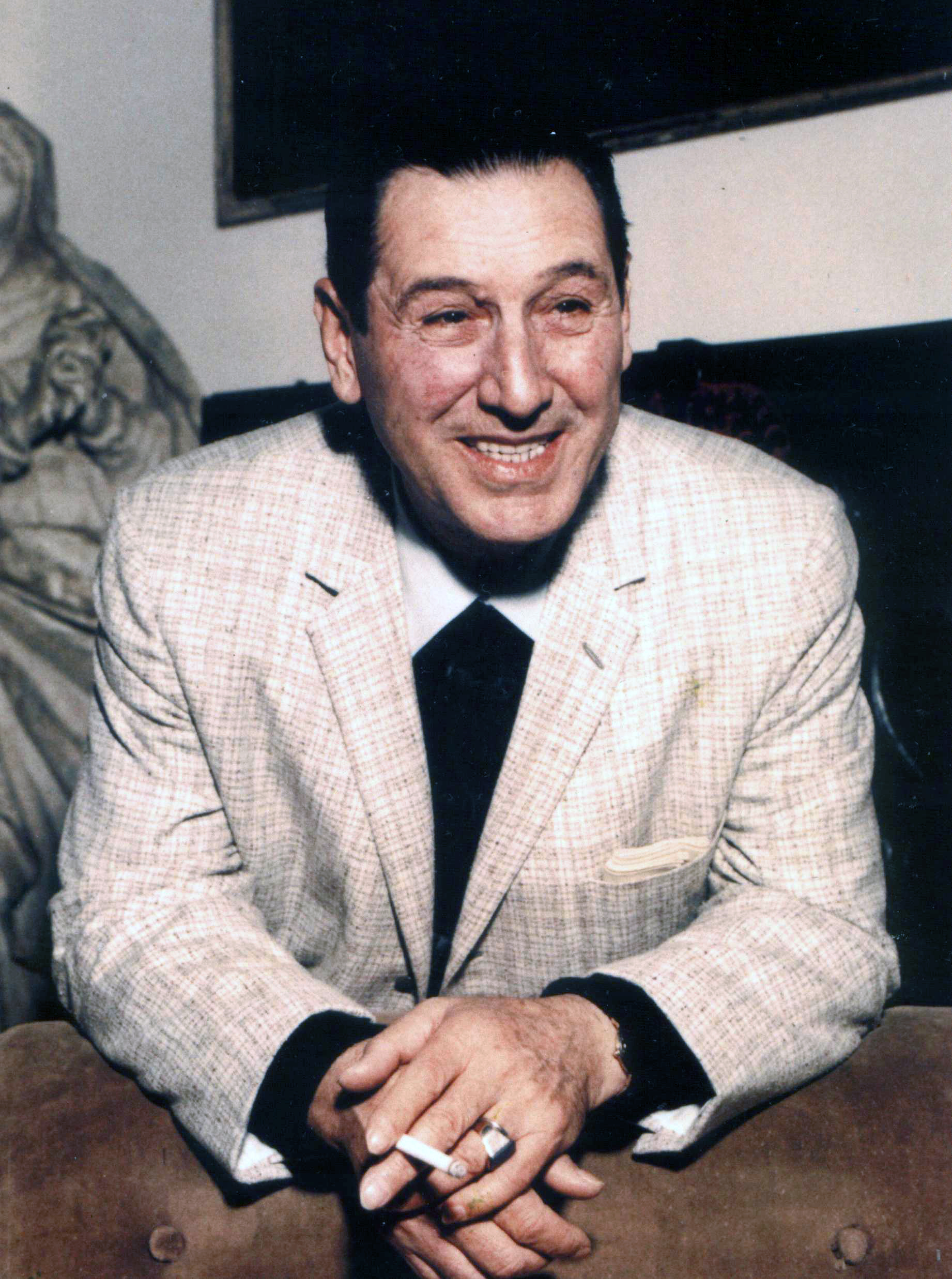
- Perón in 1973

29th & 40th President of Argentina
- In office 12 October 1973 – 1 July 1974
- Vice President: Isabel Perón
- Preceded by: Raúl Lastiri (Interim)
- Succeeded by: Isabel Perón
- In office 4 June 1946 – 21 September 1955
- Vice President: Hortensio Quijano (1946–1952); None (1952–1954); Alberto Teisaire (1954–1955)
- Preceded by: Edelmiro Julián Farrell
- Succeeded by: José Domingo Molina Gómez

20th Vice President of Argentina
- In office 8 July 1944 – 10 October 1945
- President: Edelmiro Julián Farrell
- Preceded by: Edelmiro Julián Farrell
- Succeeded by: Juan Pistarini

President of the Justicialist Party
- In office 21 November 1946 – 1 July 1974
- Preceded by: Party established
- Succeeded by: Isabel Perón

Minister of War
- In office 24 February 1944 – 10 October 1945
- President: Pedro Pablo Ramírez; Edelmiro Julián Farrell
- Preceded by: Pedro Pablo Ramírez
- Succeeded by: Eduardo Ávalos

Secretary of Labour and Social Security
- In office 1 December 1943 – 10 October 1945
- President: Pedro Pablo Ramírez; Edelmiro Julián Farrell
- Preceded by: Position established
- Succeeded by: Domingo Mercante

Personal details
- Born: Juan Domingo Perón; 8 October 1895 Lobos, Buenos Aires, Argentina
- Died: 1 July 1974 (aged 78) Buenos Aires, Argentina
- Resting place: Museo Quinta 17 de Octubre, San Vicente, Buenos Aires, Argentina
- Party: United Officers' Group (1943–1945); Labour (1945–1947); Justicialist (from 1947)
- Spouses: Aurelia Tizón (m. 1929; died 1938) Eva Duarte (m. 1945; died 1952) Isabel Martínez Cartas (m. 1961)
- Domestic partner: Nelly Rivas (1953‍–‍1955) (alleged)

Military service
- Allegiance: Argentina
- Branch/service: Argentine Army
- Years of service: 1913–1955; 1973–1974
- Rank: Lieutenant general
- Commands: Argentine Army (1946–1955; 1973–1974)
- Battles/wars: 1943 Argentine coup d'état; 1955 Argentine coup d'état
- Peron's voice Perón speaking at the Plaza de Mayo; Recorded 1945

Juan Domingo Perón (UK: /pɛˈrɒn/, US: /pɛˈroʊn, pəˈ-, peɪˈ-/, Spanish: [ˈxwan doˈmiŋɡo peˈɾon]; 8 October 1895 – 1 July 1974) was an Argentine military officer and politician who was the 29th and 40th president of Argentina, serving from 1946 to his overthrow in 1955, and from 1973 until his death in 1974. He was the only Argentine president elected three times and holds the highest percentage of votes in clean elections. Perón was one of the most important, and controversial, Argentine politicians of the 20th century; his influence extends to today. Perón's ideas, policies and movement are known as Peronism, which continues to be a force in Argentine politics.

In 1911, Perón entered military college, and rose through the ranks. In 1930, Perón supported the coup against President Hipólito Yrigoyen, a decision he regretted. Between 1939 and 1941, Perón served as a military attaché in Mussolini’s Italy. During this travel, Perón developed many of his ideas. Perón participated in the 1943 revolution and became Minister of Labor, then Minister of War and Vice President. He became known for adopting labor right reforms. Political disputes forced him to resign in October 1945 and he was arrested. On 17 October, workers gathered in the Plaza de Mayo to demand his release. Perón's surge in popularity helped him win the 1946 election.

Perón's administration was influential for initiating industrialization, expanding social rights, and making university tuition-free. Alongside his wife, Eva Duarte (Evita), the government granted women the right to vote, built half a million houses, and provided charity, especially to children, and became immensely popular among the working class. It also employed controversial tactics: dissidents were fired from their jobs, arrested or exiled, and the press was controlled. Several high-profile Nazi war criminals found refuge in Argentina. Perón was re-elected by a landslide in 1951, though his second term (1952–55) was troubled. Eva died soon after his inauguration. Religious tolerance and charity given by Eva's foundation (historically provided by the church) damaged his standing with the Catholic Church. After an attempt to sanction a divorce law and deporting two priests, he was mistakenly thought to have been excommunicated, and pro-Church elements of the armed forces bombed Plaza de Mayo, Buenos Aires, in June 1955. 300 civilians were killed in this coup attempt, which prompted reprisals against churches by Perón supporters; a coup deposed him.

During the following military dictatorships, the Peronist party was outlawed and Perón exiled. He lived in Paraguay, Venezuela, Panama and Spain. When the Peronist Héctor José Cámpora was elected president in 1973, Perón returned amidst the Ezeiza massacre and was himself elected president for a third time (October 1973–July 1974). Violence erupted between left- and right-wing Peronists, which Perón was unable to resolve. His minister José López Rega formed the Argentine Anticommunist Alliance, believed to have committed hundreds of extrajudicial killings. Perón's third wife, Isabel Perón, was elected vice president on his ticket, and succeeded him upon his death in 1974. She was ousted in 1976, and followed by even deadlier repression under the junta of Jorge Rafael Videla. Although controversial figures, Juan and Eva Perón are considered icons by supporters. The Peróns' followers praise their efforts to eliminate poverty and dignify labour, while detractors consider them demagogues and dictators. The Peróns gave their name to the political movement known as Peronism, which is represented mainly by the Justicialist Party.

== Childhood and youth ==
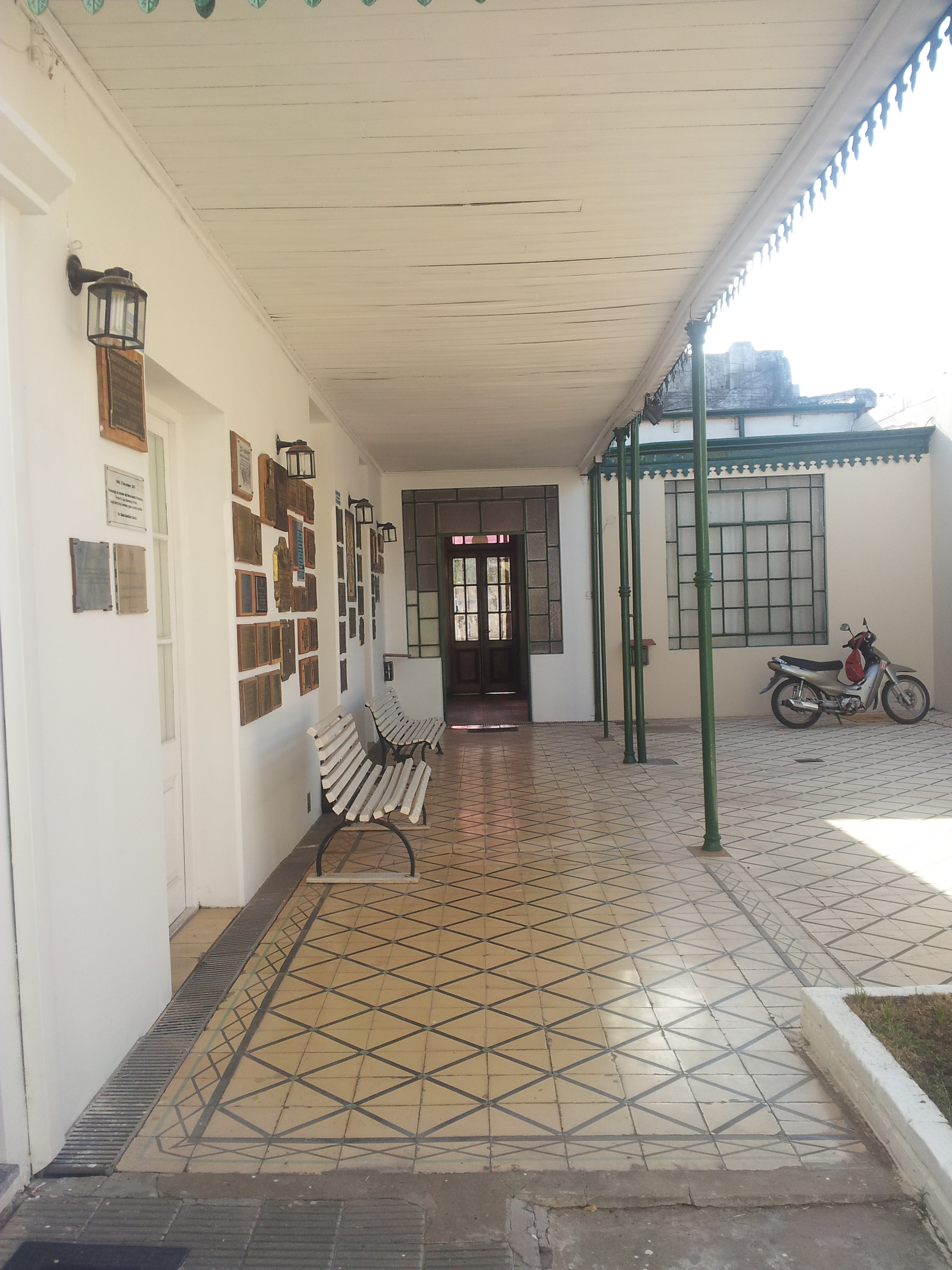
Patio inside the home in Lobos where Perón was born.

Juan Domingo Perón was born in Lobos, Buenos Aires Province, on 8 October 1895. He was the son of Juana Sosa Toledo and Mario Tomás Perón. The Perón branch of his family was originally Spanish, but settled in Spanish Sardinia, from which his great-grandfather emigrated in the 1830s; in later life Perón would publicly express his pride in his Sardinian roots. He also had Spanish, British, French and Tehuelche ancestry.

Perón's great-grandfather became a successful shoe merchant in Buenos Aires, and his grandfather was a prosperous physician; his death in 1889 left his widow nearly destitute, however, and Perón's father moved to then-rural Lobos, where he administered an estancia and met his future wife. The couple had their two sons out of wedlock and married in 1901.

His father moved to the Patagonia region that year, where he later purchased a sheep ranch. Juan himself was sent away in 1904 to a boarding school in Buenos Aires directed by his paternal grandmother, where he received a strict Catholic upbringing. His father's undertaking ultimately failed, and he died in Buenos Aires in 1928. The youth entered the National Military College in 1911 at age 16 and graduated in 1913. He excelled less in his studies than in athletics, particularly boxing and fencing.

== Army career ==
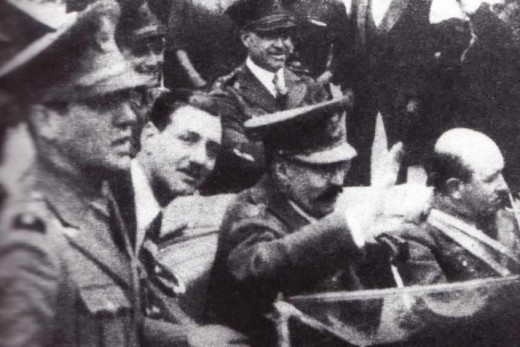
Lt. Perón (left) and General José Uriburu (middle), with whose right-wing coup in 1930 he collaborated. Perón backed the more moderate General Agustín Justo, however.

Perón began his military career in an infantry post in Paraná, Entre Ríos. He went on to command the post, and in this capacity mediated a prolonged labour conflict in 1920 at La Forestal, then a leading firm in forestry in Argentina. He earned instructor's credentials at the Superior War School, and in 1929 was appointed to the Army General Staff Headquarters. Perón married his first wife, Aurelia Tizón (Potota, as Perón fondly called her), on 5 January 1929.

Perón was recruited by supporters of the director of the War Academy, General José Félix Uriburu, to collaborate in the latter's plans for a military coup against President Hipólito Yrigoyen of Argentina. Perón, who instead supported General Agustín Justo, was banished to a remote post in northwestern Argentina after Uriburu's successful coup in September 1930. Nevertheless, he was promoted to the rank of major the following year and named to the faculty at the Superior War School, where he taught military history and published a number of treatises on the subject. He served as military attaché in the Argentine Embassy in Chile from 1936 to 1938 and returned to his teaching post. His wife was diagnosed with uterine cancer that year and died on 10 September at age 36; the couple had no children.

The Argentine War Ministry assigned Perón to study mountain warfare in the Italian Alps in 1939. He also attended the University of Turin for a semester and served as a military observer in countries across Europe – holding positions as a military attaché in Berlin and in Rome. He studied Benito Mussolini's Italian Fascism, Nazi Germany, and other European governments of the time, concluding in his summary, Apuntes de historia militar (Notes about military history, first published in 1932, 2nd ed., 1934), that social democracy could be a viable alternative to liberal democracy (which he viewed as a veiled plutocracy) or to totalitarian régimes (which he viewed as oppressive). He returned to Argentina in 1941, and served as an army skiing-instructor in Mendoza Province.

== Military government of 1943–1946 ==
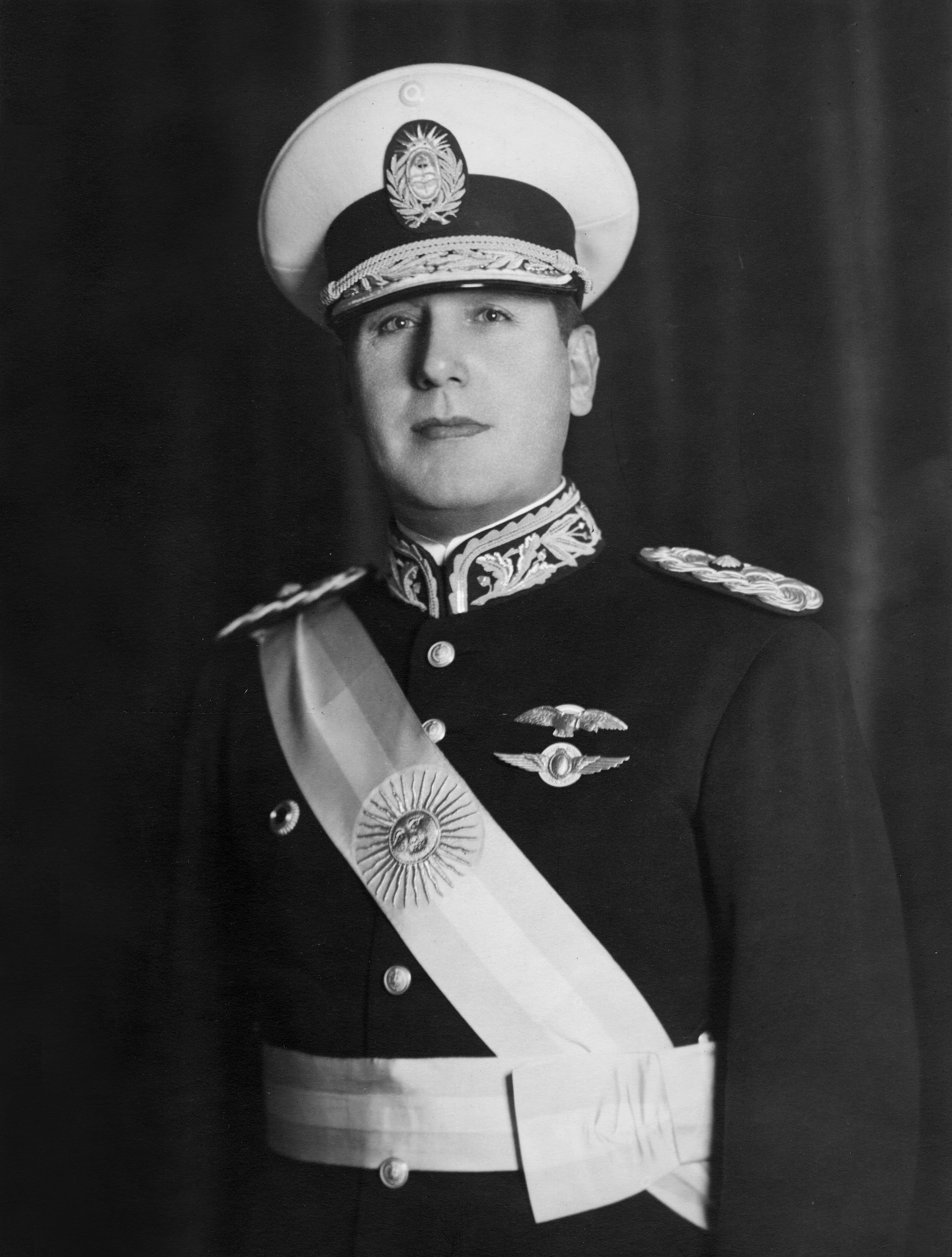
Perón in 1940

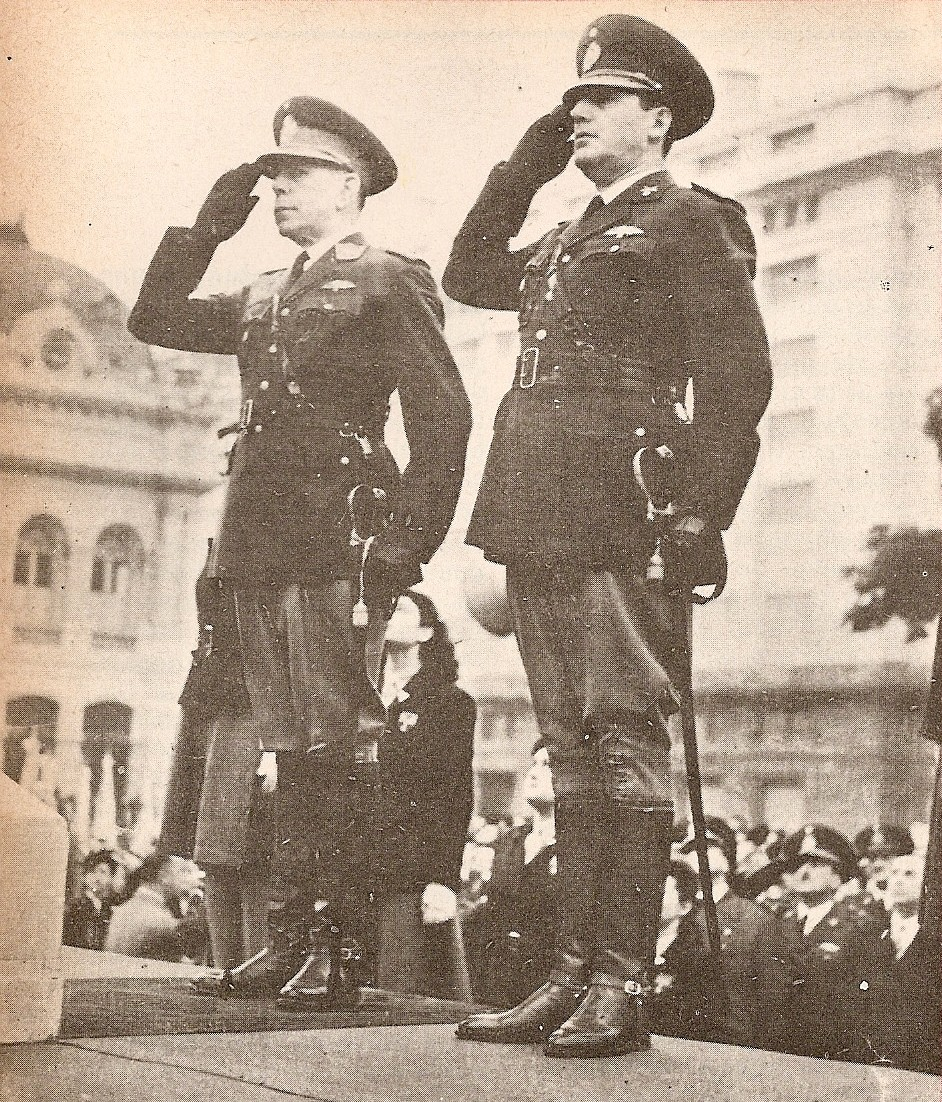
President Edelmiro Farrell (left) and his benefactor, Vice President and Colonel Juan Perón, in April 1945.

In 1943 a coup d'état was led by General Arturo Rawson against Ramón Castillo, who had assumed the presidency a little less than a year earlier as the vice president of Roberto María Ortiz following Ortiz's resignation due to illness; both Ortiz and Castillo had been elected in the 1937 presidential election, which has been described as being among the most fraudulent in Argentine history. The military was opposed to Governor Robustiano Patrón Costas, Castillo's hand-picked successor, who was the principal landowner in Salta Province, as well as a main stockholder in its sugar industry.

As a colonel, Perón took a significant part in the military coup by the GOU (United Officers' Group, a secret society) against the conservative civilian government of Castillo. At first an assistant to Secretary of War General Edelmiro Farrell, under the administration of General Pedro Ramírez, he later became the head of the then-insignificant Department of Labour. Perón's work in the Labour Department witnessed the passage of a broad range of progressive social reforms designed to improve working conditions, and led to an alliance with the socialist and syndicalist movements in the Argentine labour unions, which increased his power and influence in the military government.

After the coup, socialists from the CGT-Nº1 labour union, through mercantile labour leader Ángel Borlenghi and railway union lawyer Juan Atilio Bramuglia, made contact with Perón and fellow GOU Colonel Domingo Mercante. They established an alliance to promote labour laws that had long been demanded by the workers' movement, to strengthen the unions, and to transform the Department of Labour into a more significant government office. Perón had the Department of Labour elevated to a cabinet-level secretariat in November 1943.

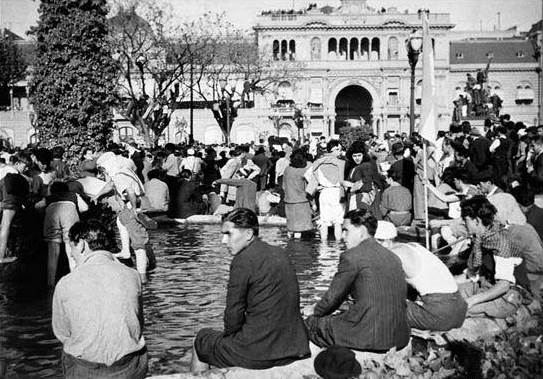
Demonstration for Perón's release on 17 October 1945

Following the devastating January 1944 San Juan earthquake, which claimed over 10,000 lives and leveled the Andes range city, Perón became nationally prominent in relief efforts. Junta leader Pedro Ramírez entrusted fundraising efforts to him, and Perón marshaled celebrities from Argentina's large film industry and other public figures. For months, a giant thermometer hung from the Buenos Aires Obelisk to track the fundraising. The effort's success and relief for earthquake victims earned Perón widespread public approval. At this time, he met a minor radio matinee star, Eva Duarte.

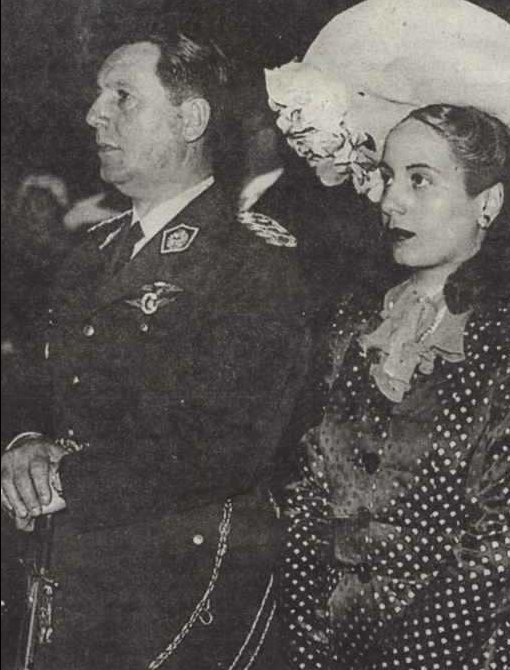
Juan and Eva Perón

Following President Ramírez's January 1944 suspension of diplomatic relations with the Axis powers (against whom the new junta would declare war in March 1945), the GOU junta unseated him in favor of General Edelmiro Farrell. For contributing to his success, Perón was appointed vice president and Secretary of War, while retaining his Labour portfolio. As Minister of Labour, Perón established the INPS (the first national social insurance system in Argentina), settled industrial disputes in favour of labour unions (as long as their leaders pledged political allegiance to him), and introduced a wide range of social welfare benefits for unionised workers.

Employers were forced to improve working conditions and to provide severance pay and accident compensation, the conditions under which workers could be dismissed were restricted, a system of labour courts to handle the grievances of workers was established, the working day was reduced in various industries, and paid holidays/vacations were generalised to the entire workforce. Perón also passed a law providing minimum wages, maximum hours and vacations for rural workers, froze rural rents, presided over a large increase in rural wages, and helped lumber, wine, sugar and migrant workers organize themselves. From 1943 to 1946, real wages grew by only 4%, but in 1945 Perón established two new institutions that would later increase wages: the "aguinaldo" (a bonus that provided each worker with a lump sum at the end of the year amounting to one-twelfth of the annual wage) and the National Institute of Compensation, which implemented a minimum wage and collected data on living standards, prices, and wages. Leveraging his authority on behalf of striking abattoir workers and the right to unionise, Perón became increasingly thought of as a presidential candidate.

On 18 September 1945, he delivered an address billed as "from work to home and from home to work". The speech, prefaced by an excoriation of the conservative opposition, provoked an ovation by declaring that "we've passed social reforms to make the Argentine people proud to live where they live, once again." This move fed growing rivalries against Perón and on 9 October 1945, he was forced to resign by opponents within the armed forces. Arrested four days later, he was released due to mass demonstrations organised by the CGT and other supporters; 17 October was later commemorated as Loyalty Day. His paramour, Eva Duarte, became hugely popular after helping organize the demonstration; known as "Evita", she helped Perón gain support with labour and women's groups. She and Perón were married on 22 October.

== First term (1946–1952) ==
=== Domestic policy ===
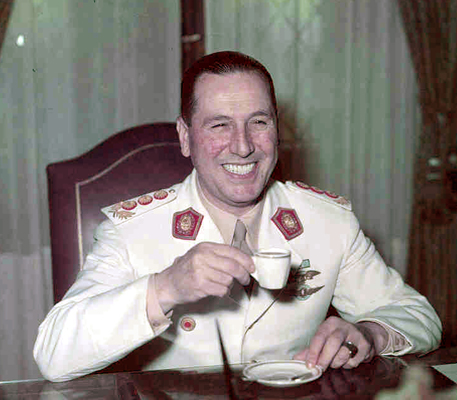
Lt. General Perón in military uniform, drinking coffee (1950 or later)

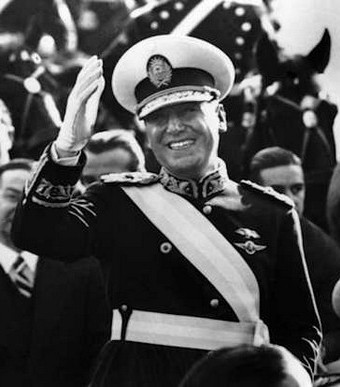
President Perón at his 1946 inaugural parade

Perón's candidacy on the Labour Party ticket, announced the day after the 17 October 1945 mobilization, became a lightning rod that rallied an unusually diverse opposition against it. The majority of the centrist Radical Civic Union (UCR), the Socialist Party, the Communist Party and most of the conservative National Autonomist Party (in power during most of the 1874–1916 era) had already been forged into a fractious alliance in June by interests in the financial sector and the chamber of commerce, united solely by the goal of keeping Perón from the Casa Rosada. Organizing a massive kick-off rally in front of Congress on 8 December, the Democratic Union nominated José Tamborini and Enrique Mosca, two prominent UCR congressmen. The alliance failed to win over several prominent lawmakers, such as congressmen Ricardo Balbín and Arturo Frondizi and former Córdoba governor Amadeo Sabattini, all of whom opposed the Union's ties to conservative interests. In a bid to support their campaign, US Ambassador Spruille Braden published a white paper, otherwise known as the Blue Book accusing Perón, President Farrell and others of Fascist ties. Fluent in Spanish, Braden addressed Democratic Union rallies in person, but his move backfired when Perón summarized the election as a choice between "Perón or Braden". He also rallied further support by responding to the "Blue Book" with his own "Blue and White Book", which was a play on the Argentine flag colors, and focused on the antagonism of American imperialism. He persuaded the president to sign the nationalization of the Central Bank and the extension of mandatory Christmas bonuses, actions that contributed to his decisive victory. Perón and his running mate, Hortensio Quijano, leveraged popular support to victory over a Radical Civic Union-led opposition alliance by about 11% in the 24 February 1946 presidential elections.

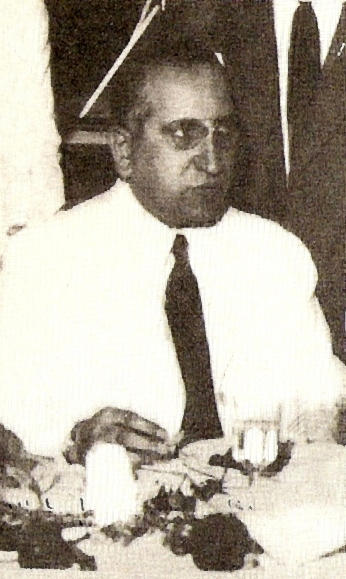
Ángel Borlenghi, an erstwhile socialist who, as Interior Minister, oversaw new labour courts and the opposition's activities.

When Perón became president on 4 June 1946, his two stated goals were social justice and economic independence. These two goals avoided Cold War entanglements related to choosing between capitalism and socialism, but he had no concrete means to achieve those goals. Perón instructed his economic advisers to develop a five-year plan with the goals of increasing workers' pay, achieving full employment, stimulating industrial growth to over 40% while diversifying the economy (then dominated by food processing), and greatly improving transportation, communication, energy and social infrastructure (in the private, as well as public, sectors).

Perón's planning prominently included political considerations. Numerous military allies were fielded as candidates, notably Colonel Domingo Mercante who, when elected Governor of the paramount Province of Buenos Aires, became renowned for his housing program. Having brought him to power, the General Confederation of Labour (CGT) was given overwhelming support by the new administration, which introduced labour courts and filled its cabinet with labour union appointees, such as Juan Atilio Bramuglia (Foreign Ministry) and Ángel Borlenghi (Interior Ministry, which, in Argentina, oversees law enforcement). It also made room for amenable wealthy industrialists (Central Bank President Miguel Miranda) and socialists such as José Figuerola, a Spanish economist who had years earlier advised that nation's ill-fated regime of Miguel Primo de Rivera. Intervention on their behalf by Perón's appointees encouraged the CGT to call strikes in the face of employers reluctant to grant benefits or honor new labour legislation. Strike activity (with 500,000 working days lost in 1945) leapt to 2 million in 1946 and to over 3 million in 1947, helping wrest needed labour reforms, though permanently aligning large employers against the Peronists. Labour unions grew in ranks from around 500,000 to over 2 million by 1950, primarily in the CGT, which has since been Argentina's paramount labour union. Argentina's labour force numbered around 5 million people at the time and was the most unionized in South America.

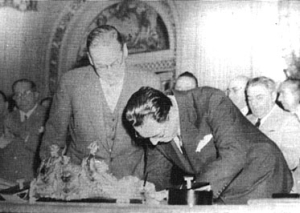
President Perón (right) signs the nationalization of British-owned railways watched by Ambassador Sir Reginald Leeper, March 1948.

During the first half of the 20th century, a widening gap had existed between the classes; Perón hoped to close it through the increase of wages and employment, making the nation more pluralistic and less reliant on foreign trade. Before taking office in 1946, President Perón took dramatic steps which he believed would result in a more economically independent Argentina, better insulated from events such as World War II. He thought there would be another international war. The reduced availability of imports and the war's beneficial effects on both the quantity and price of Argentine exports had combined to create a US$1.7 billion cumulative surplus during those years.

In his first two years in office, Perón nationalized the Central Bank and paid off its billion-dollar debt to the Bank of England; nationalized the railways (mostly owned by British and French companies), merchant marine, universities, public utilities, public transport (then, mostly tramways); and, probably most significantly, created a single purchaser for the nation's mostly export-oriented grains and oilseeds, the Institute for the Promotion of Trade (IAPI). The IAPI wrested control of Argentina's famed grain export sector from entrenched conglomerates such as Bunge y Born; but when commodity prices fell after 1948, it began shortchanging growers. IAPI profits were used to fund welfare projects, while internal demand was encouraged by large wage increases given to workers; average real wages rose by about 35% from 1945 to 1949, while during that same period, labour's share of national income rose from 40% to 49%. Access to healthcare was also made a universal right by the Workers' Bill of Rights enacted on 24 February 1947 (subsequently incorporated into the 1949 Constitution as Article 14-b), while social security was extended to virtually all members of the Argentine working class. From 1947 to 1950, the scope of security was extended (as noted by one study) “in the case of civil servants, aviation personnel, commercial and banking employees, the staff of private companies engaged in public services, soldiers, railwaymen and others, and set up a general non-contributory old-age pension scheme.” Various labor laws were also passed during the course of Perón's presidency.

From 1946 to 1951, the number of Argentinians covered by social security more than tripled, so that in 1951 more than 5 million people (70% of the economically active population) were covered by social security. Health insurance also spread to new industries, including banking and metalworking. Between 1945 and 1949, real wages went up by 22%, fell between 1949 and 1952, and then increased again from 1953 to 1955, ending up at least 30% higher than in 1946. In proportional terms, wages rose from 41% of national income in 1946–48 to 49% in 1952–55. The boost in the real incomes of workers was encouraged by government policies such as the enforcement of minimum wage laws, controls on the prices of food and other basic consumption items and extending housing credits to workers.

=== Foreign policy and adversaries ===
Perón first articulated his foreign policy, the "Third Way", in 1949. This policy was developed to avoid the binary Cold War divisions and keep other world powers, such as the United States and the Soviet Union, as allies rather than enemies. He restored diplomatic relations with the Soviet Union, severed since the Bolshevik Revolution in 1917, and opened grain sales to the shortage-stricken Soviets.

Perón's ability to effectively deal with points of contention abroad was hampered by his own mistrust of potential rivals, which harmed foreign relations with Juan Atilio Bramuglia's 1949 dismissal.

The rising influence of American diplomat George F. Kennan, a staunch anti-communist and champion of containment, fed U.S. suspicions that Argentine goals of economic sovereignty and neutrality were Perón's disguise for a resurgence of communism in the Americas. The U.S. Congress took a dislike to Perón and his government. In 1948 they excluded Argentine exports from the Marshall Plan, the landmark Truman administration effort to combat communism and help rebuild war-torn European nations by offering U.S. aid. This contributed to Argentine financial crises after 1948 and, according to Perón biographer Joseph Page, "the Marshall Plan drove a final nail into the coffin that bore Perón's ambitions to transform Argentina into an industrial power". The policy deprived Argentina of potential agricultural markets in Western Europe to the benefit of Canadian exporters, for instance.

As relations with the U.S. deteriorated, Perón made efforts to mitigate the misunderstandings, which were made easier after President Harry Truman replaced the hostile Braden with Ambassador George Messersmith. Perón negotiated the release of Argentinian assets in the U.S. in exchange for preferential treatment for U.S. goods, followed by Argentine ratification of the Act of Chapultepec, a centerpiece of Truman's Latin America policy. He even proposed the enlistment of Argentine troops into the Korean War in 1950 under UN auspices (a move retracted in the face of public opposition). Perón was opposed to borrowing from foreign credit markets, preferring to float bonds domestically. He refused to enter the General Agreement on Tariffs and Trade (precursor to the World Trade Organization) or the International Monetary Fund.

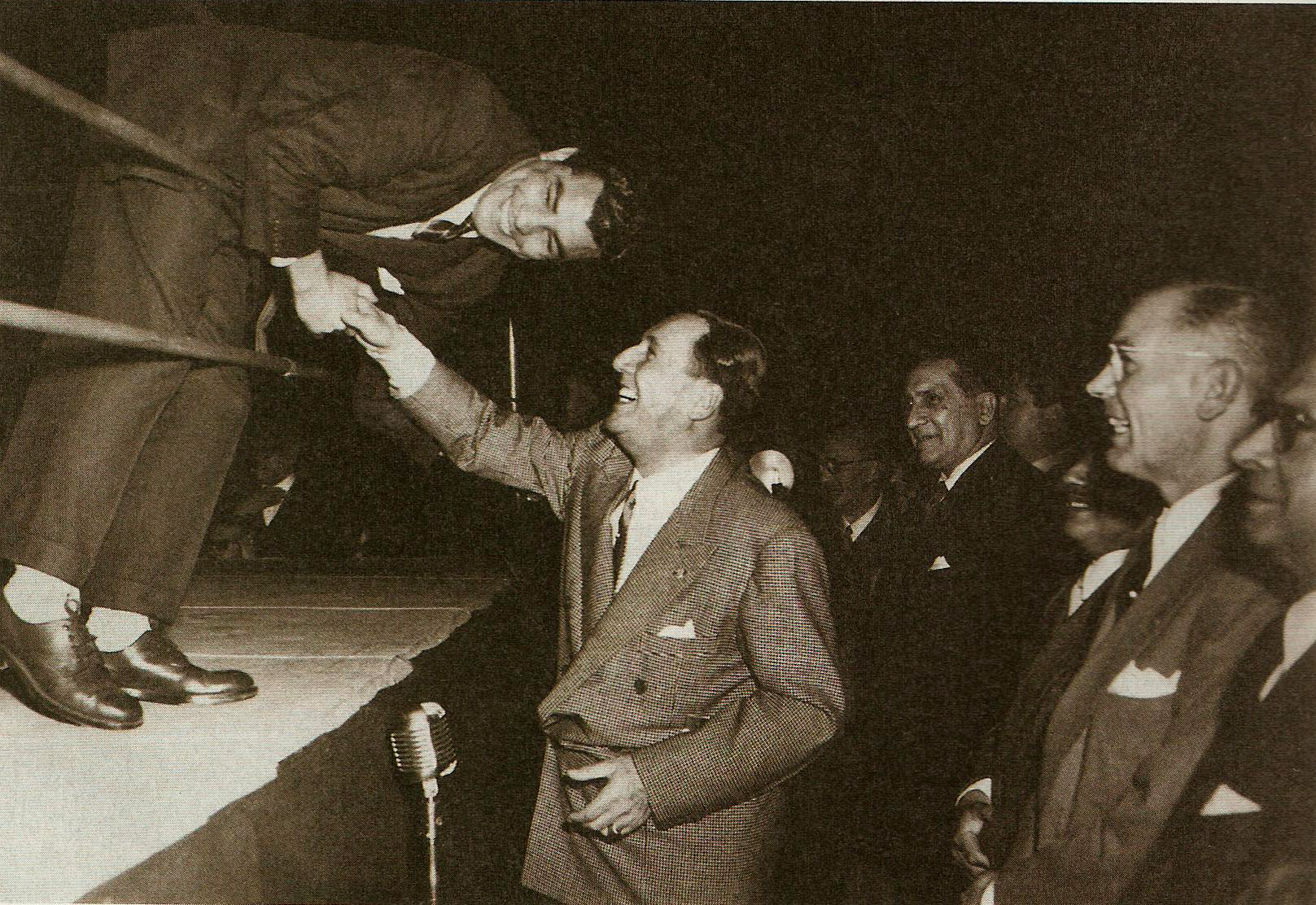
As president, Perón took an active interest in the development of sports in Argentina, hosting international events and sponsoring athletes such as the boxer, José María Gatica (left).

Believing that international sports created goodwill, however, Perón hosted the 1950 World Basketball Championship and the 1951 Pan American Games, both of which Argentine athletes won resoundingly. He also sponsored numerous notable athletes, including the five-time Formula 1 world champion, Juan Manuel Fangio, who, without this funding, would have most likely never competed in Europe. Perón's bid to host the 1956 Summer Olympics in Buenos Aires lost in the International Olympic Committee by one vote.

=== Growth and limitations ===
Economic success was short-lived. Following a lumbering recovery during 1933 to 1945, from 1946 to 1953 Argentina reaped the benefits of Perón's five-year plan. The GDP increased by over a fourth during that brief boom, about as much as it had during the previous decade. Using roughly half the US$1.7 billion in reserves inherited from wartime surpluses for nationalizations, economic development agencies devoted most of the other half to finance both public and private investments; the roughly 70% jump in domestic fixed investment was accounted for mostly by industrial growth in the private sector. All this much-needed activity exposed an intrinsic weakness in the plan: it subsidized growth which, in the short term, led to a wave of imports of the capital goods that local industry could not supply. Whereas the end of World War II had allowed Argentine exports to rise from US$700 million to US$1.6 billion, Perón's changes led to skyrocketing imports (from US$300 million to US$1.6 billion) and erased the surplus by 1948.

Perón's bid for economic independence was further complicated by a number of inherited external factors. Great Britain owed Argentina over 150 million pounds Sterling (nearly US$650 million) for agricultural exports during the war. This debt was mostly in the form of Argentine Central Bank reserves which, per the 1933 Roca-Runciman Treaty, were deposited in the Bank of England. The money was useless to the Argentine government, because the treaty allowed Bank of England to hold the funds in trust, something British planners could not compromise on as a result of that country's debts accrued under the Lend-Lease Act.

The country's need for U.S. made capital goods increased, though ongoing limits on the Central Bank's availability of hard currency hampered access to them. Argentina's pound sterling surpluses earned after 1946 (worth over US$200 million) were made convertible to dollars by a treaty negotiated by Central Bank President Miguel Miranda; but after a year, British Prime Minister Clement Attlee suspended the provision. Perón accepted the transfer of over 24,000 km (15,000 mi) of British-owned railways (over half the total in Argentina) in exchange for the debt in March 1948. Due to political disputes between Perón and the U.S. government (as well as pressure from the U.S. agricultural lobby through the Agricultural Act of 1949), Argentine foreign exchange earnings via its exports to the United States fell, turning a US$100 million surplus with the United States into a US$300 million deficit. The combined pressure practically devoured Argentina's liquid reserves and Miranda issued a temporary restriction on the outflow of dollars to U.S. banks. The nationalization of the Port of Buenos Aires and domestic and foreign-owned private cargo ships, as well as the purchase of others, nearly tripled the national merchant marine to 1.2 million tons' displacement, reducing the need for over US$100 million in shipping fees (then the largest source of Argentina's invisible balance deficit) and leading to the inauguration of the Río Santiago Shipyards at Ensenada (on line to the present day).

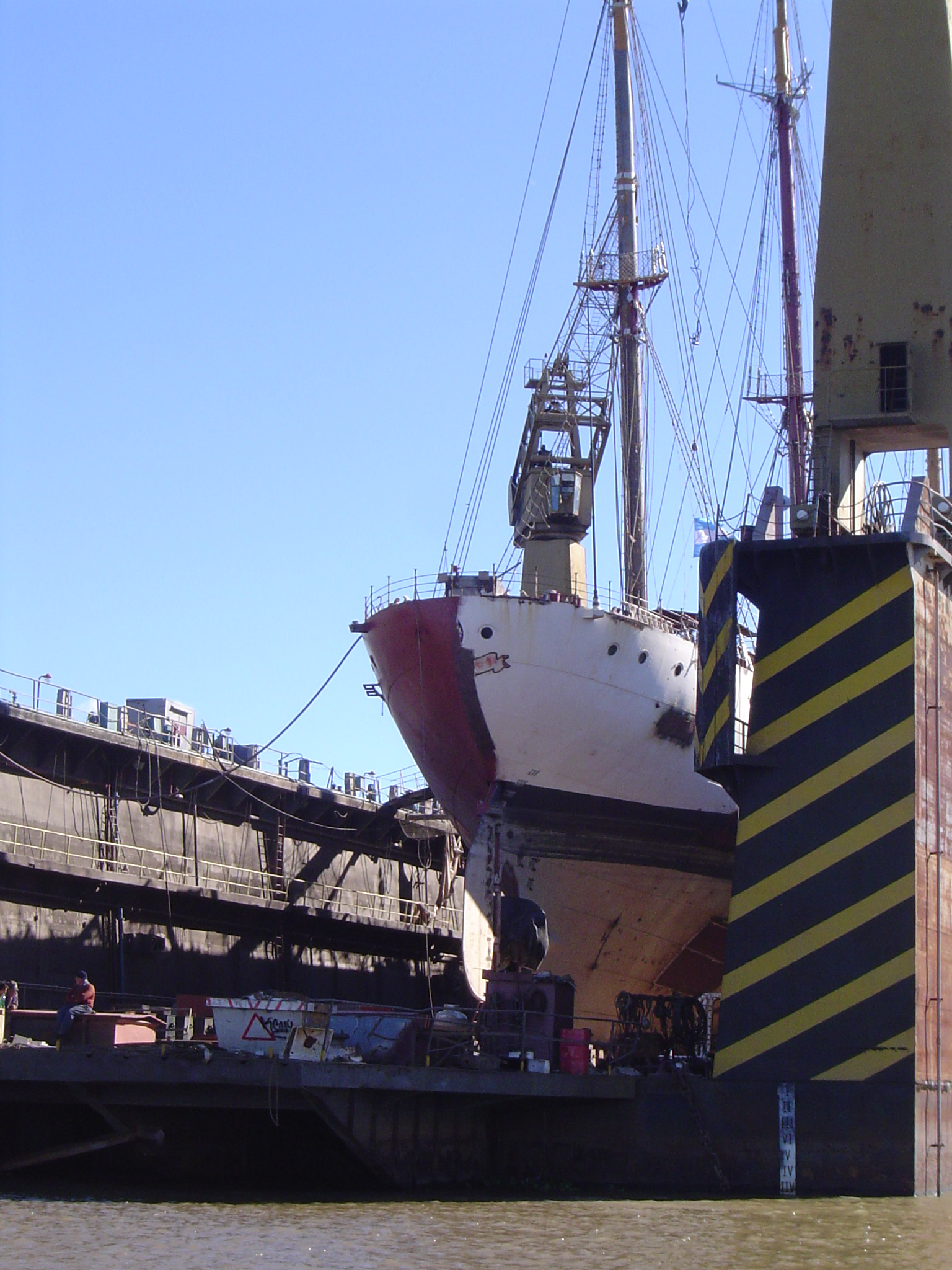
Repairs at the Río Santiago Shipyards

Exports fell sharply, to around US$1.1 billion during the 1949–54 era (a severe 1952 drought trimmed this to US$700 million), due in part to a deterioration in terms of trade of about a third. The Central Bank was forced to devalue the peso at an unprecedented rate: the peso lost about 70% of its value from early 1948 to early 1950, leading to a decline in imports fueling industrial growth and to recession. Short of central bank reserves, Perón was forced to borrow US$125 million from the U.S. Export-Import Bank to cover a number of private banks' debts to U.S. institutions, without which their insolvency would have become a central bank liability. Austerity and better harvests in 1950 helped finance a recovery in 1951; but inflation, having risen from 13% in 1948 to 31% in 1949, reached 50% in late 1951 before stabilizing, and a second, sharper recession soon followed. Workers' purchasing power, by 1952, had declined 20% from its 1948 high and GDP, having leapt by a fourth during Perón's first two years, saw zero growth from 1948 to 1952. After 1952, however, wages began rising in real terms once more.

The growing frequency of strikes, increasingly directed against Perón as the economy slid into stagflation in late 1954, was dealt with through the expulsion of organizers from the CGT ranks. To consolidate his political grasp on the eve of colder economic winds, Perón called for broad constitutional reform in September. The elected convention (whose opposition members soon resigned) approved the wholesale replacement of the 1853 Constitution of Argentina with a new magna carta in March, explicitly guaranteeing social reforms; but also allowing the mass nationalization of natural resources and public services, as well as the re-election of the president.

=== Focus on infrastructure ===
Emphasizing an economic policy centerpiece dating from the 1920s, Perón made record investments in Argentina's infrastructure. Investing over US$100 million to modernize the railways (originally built on myriad incompatible gauges), he also nationalized a number of small, regional air carriers, forcing them into Aerolíneas Argentinas in 1950. The airline, equipped with 36 new DC-3 and DC-4 aircraft, was supplemented with a new international airport and a 22 km (14 mi) freeway into Buenos Aires. This freeway was followed by one between Rosario and Santa Fe.

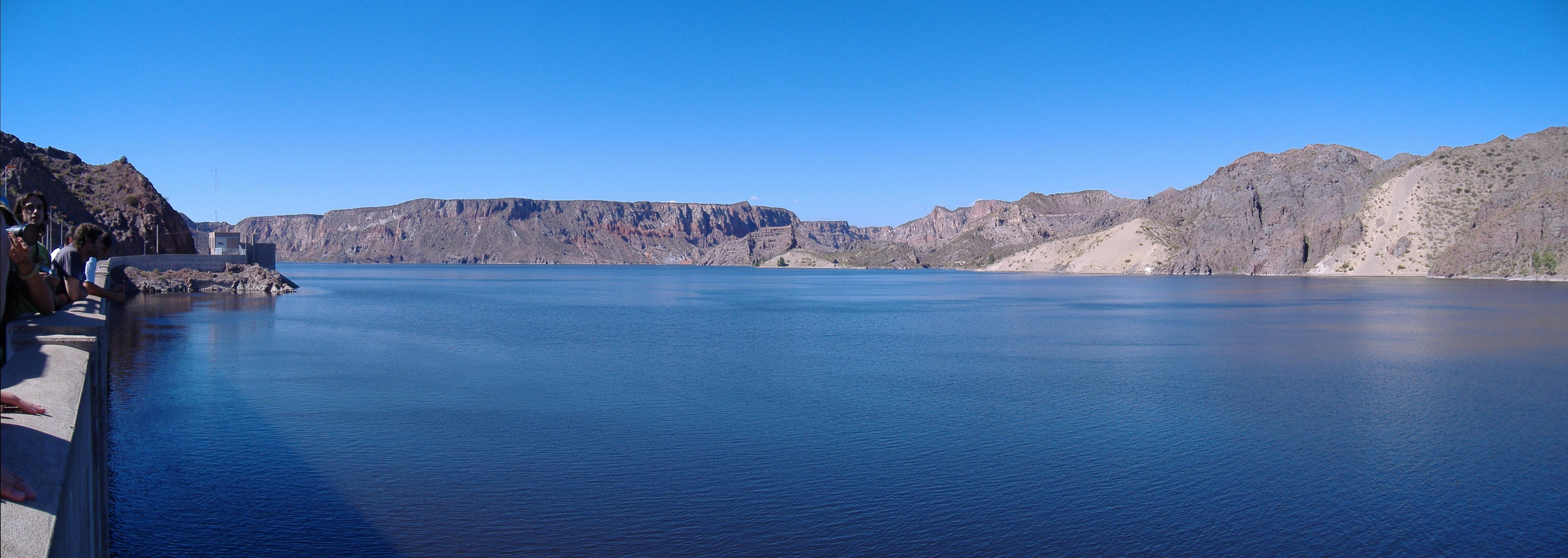
Reservoir of the Valle Grande hydroelectric dam, near San Rafael, Mendoza

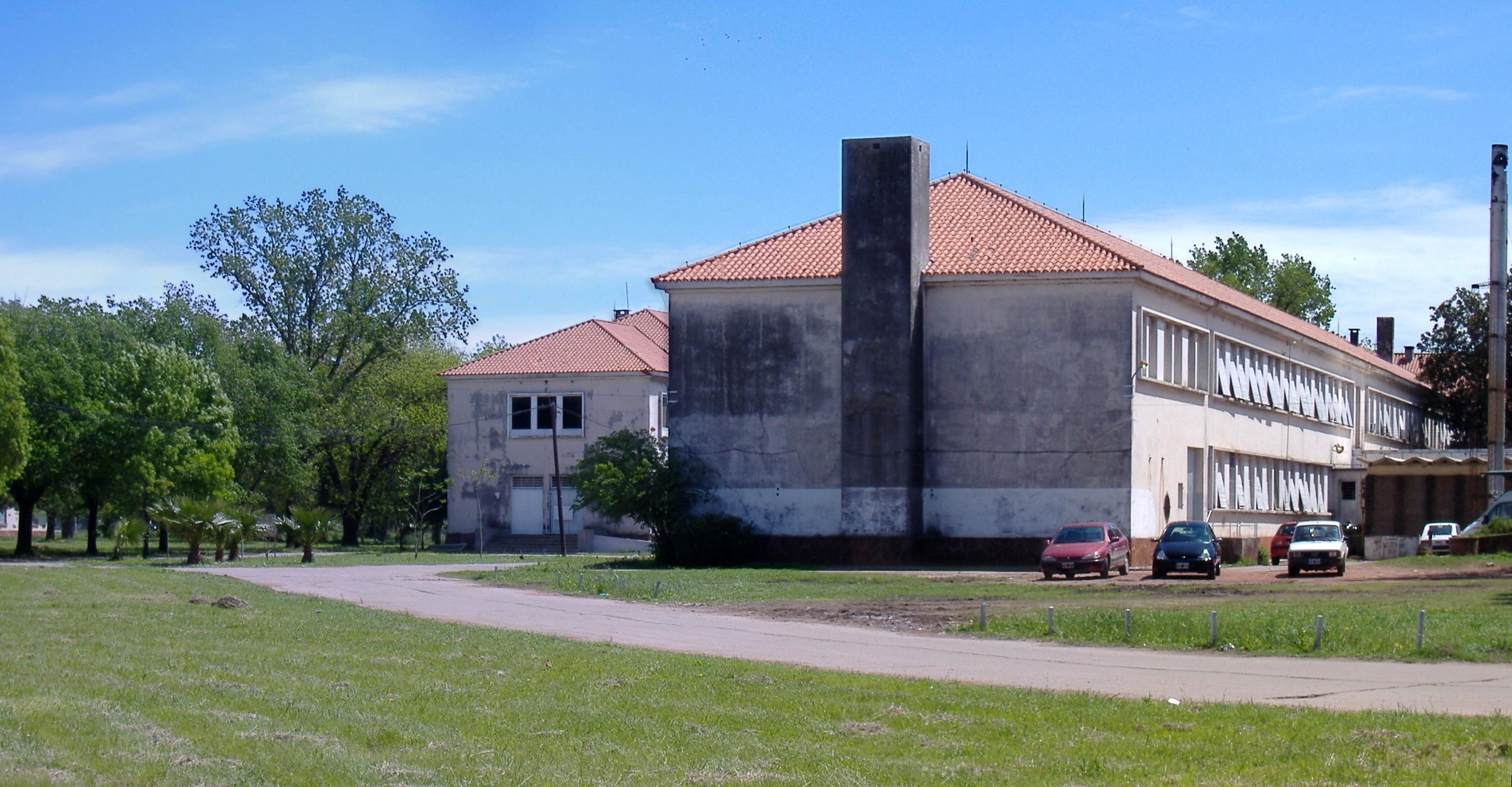
A hospital near Rosario, one of hundreds built during the Perón years

Perón had mixed success in expanding the country's inadequate electric grid, which grew by only one fourth during his tenure. Argentina's installed hydroelectric capacity, however, leapt from 45 to 350 MW during his first term (to about a fifth of the total public grid). He promoted the fossil fuel industry by ordering these resources nationalized, inaugurating the Río Turbio coal mine, having natural gas flared by the state oil firm YPF captured, and establishing Gas del Estado. The 1949 completion of a gas pipeline between Comodoro Rivadavia and Buenos Aires was another significant accomplishment in this regard. The 1,700 km (1,060 mi) pipeline allowed natural gas production to rise quickly from 300,000 m^{3} to 15 million m^{3} daily, making the country self-sufficient in the critical energy staple; the pipeline was, at the time, the longest in the world.

Propelled by an 80% increase in output at the state-owned energy firm YPF, oil production rose from 3.3 million m^{3} to over 4.8 million m^{3} during Perón's tenure; but since most manufacturing was powered by on-site generators and the number of motor vehicles grew by a third, the need for oil imports grew from 40% to half of the consumption, costing the national balance sheet over US$300 million a year (over a fifth of the import bill).

Perón's government is remembered for its record social investments. He introduced a Ministry of Health to the cabinet; its first head, the neurologist Ramón Carrillo, oversaw the completion of over 4,200 healthcare facilities. Related works included construction of more than 1,000 kindergartens and over 8,000 schools, including several hundred technological, nursing and teachers' schools, among an array of other public investments. The new Minister of Public Works, General Juan Pistarini, oversaw the construction of 650,000 new public sector homes, as well as of the eponymous international airport, one of the largest in the world at the time. The reactivation of the dormant National Mortgage Bank spurred private-sector housing development: averaging over 8 units per 1,000 inhabitants (150,000 a year), the pace was, at the time, on par with that of the United States and one of the highest rates of residential construction in the world.

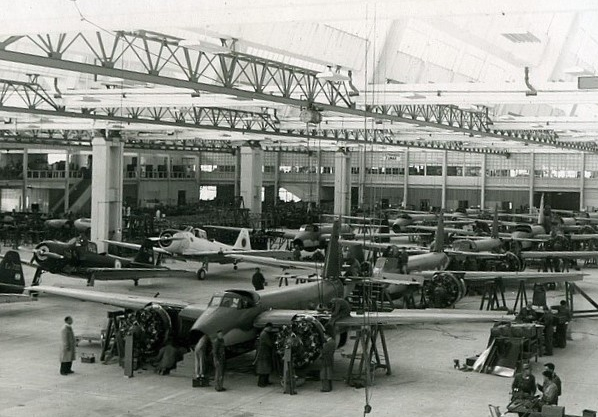
Production line at the state military industries facility, 1950; online since 1927, Perón's budgets modernized and expanded the complex.

Perón modernized the Argentine Armed Forces, particularly its Air Force. Between 1947 and 1950, Argentina manufactured two advanced jet aircraft: Pulqui I (designed by the Argentine engineers Cardehilac, Morchio and Ricciardi with the French engineer Émile Dewoitine, condemned in France in absentia for collaborationism), and Pulqui II, designed by German engineer Kurt Tank. In the test flights, the planes were flown by Lieutenant Edmundo Osvaldo Weiss and Tank, reaching 1,000 km/h (620 mph) with the Pulqui II. Argentina continued testing the Pulqui II until 1959; in the tests, two pilots lost their lives. The Pulqui project opened the door to two successful Argentinian planes: the IA 58 Pucará and the IA 63 Pampa, manufactured at the Aircraft Factory of Córdoba.

Perón announced in 1951 that the Huemul Project would produce nuclear fusion before any other country. The project was led by an Austrian, Ronald Richter, who had been recommended by Kurt Tank. Tank expected to power his aircraft with Richter's invention. Perón announced that energy produced by the fusion process would be delivered in milk-bottle sized containers. Richter announced success in 1951, but no proof was given. The next year, Perón appointed a scientific team to investigate Richter's activities. Reports by José Antonio Balseiro and Mario Báncora revealed that the project was a fraud. After that, the Huemul Project was transferred to the Centro Atómico Bariloche (CAB) of the new National Atomic Energy Commission (CNEA) and to the physics institute of the Universidad Nacional de Cuyo, later named Instituto Balseiro (IB). According to a recently aired History Channel documentary, the secrecy, Nazi connections, declassified US intelligence documents, and military infrastructure located around the remote facility all argue for the more likely objective of atomic bomb development. The Argentine navy actually bombed multiple buildings in 1955 – an unusual method of decommissioning a legitimate research facility.

=== Eva Perón's influence and contribution ===
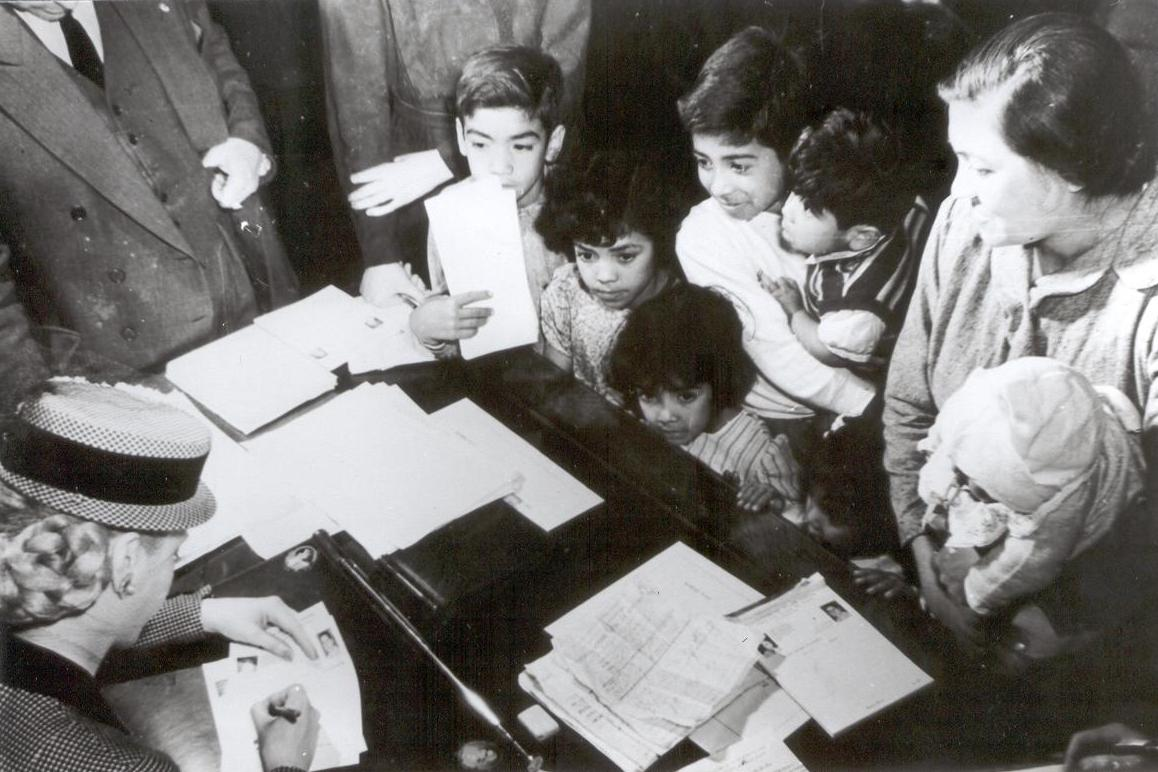
First Lady Eva Perón (left) tending to the needy in her capacity as head of her foundation

Eva Perón was instrumental as a symbol of hope to the common labourer during the first five-year plan. When she died in 1952, the year of the presidential elections, the people felt they had lost an ally. Coming from humble origins, she was loathed by the elite but adored by the poor for her work with the sick, elderly, and orphans. It was due to her behind-the-scenes work that women's suffrage was granted in 1947 and a feminist wing of the 3rd party in Argentina was formed. Simultaneous to Perón's five-year plans, Eva supported a women's movement that concentrated on the rights of women, poor people, and disabled people.

Although her role in the politics of Perón's first term remains disputed, Eva introduced social justice and equality into the national discourse. She stated, "It is not philanthropy, nor is it charity... It is not even social welfare; to me, it is strict justice... I do nothing but return to the poor what the rest of us owe them, because we had taken it away from them unjustly."

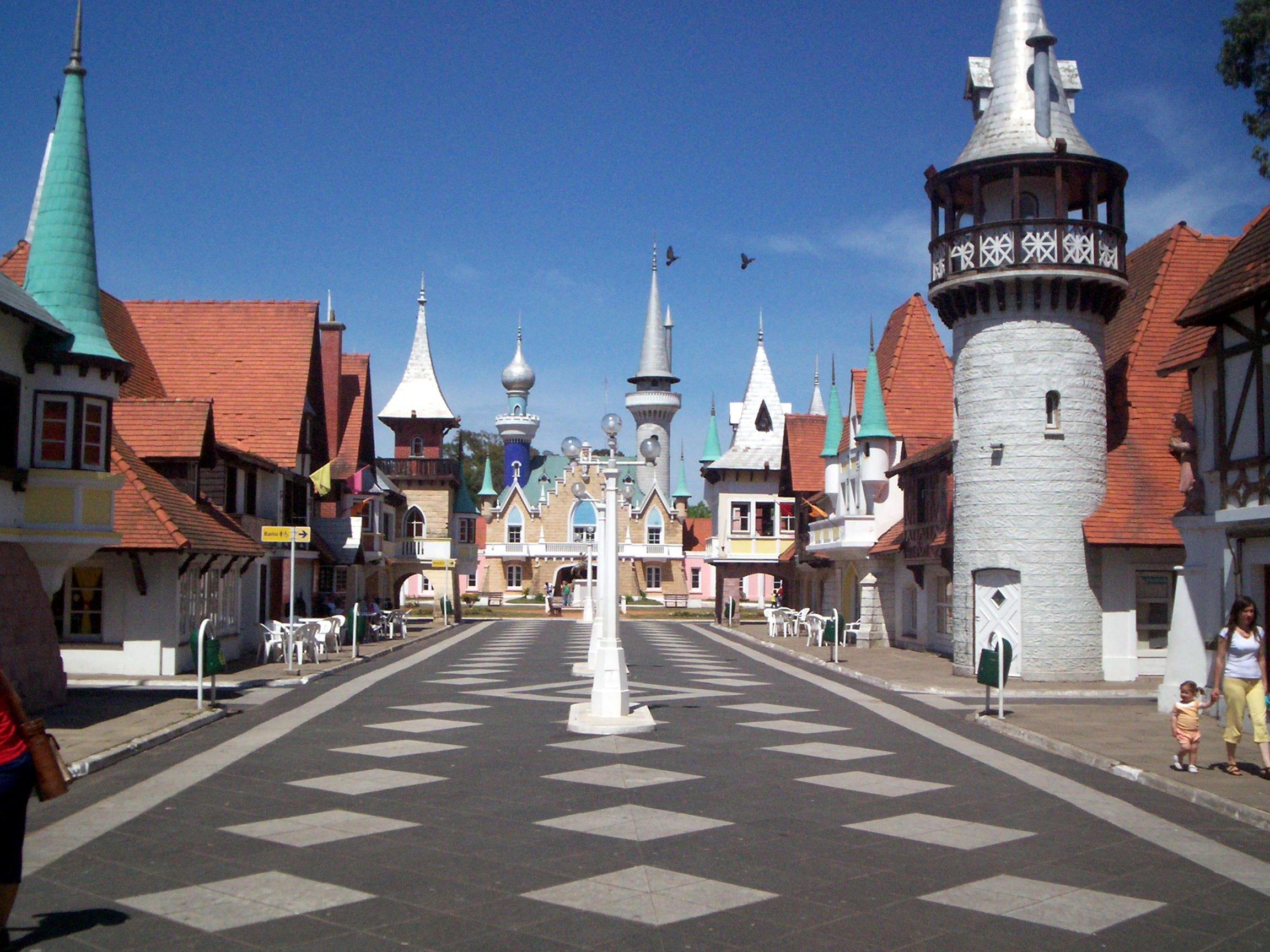
Partial view of the "Children's Republic" theme park.

In 1948 she established the Eva Perón Foundation, which was perhaps the greatest contribution to her husband's social policy. Enjoying an annual budget of around US$50 million (nearly 1% of GDP at the time), the Foundation had 14,000 employees and founded hundreds of new schools, clinics, old-age homes and holiday facilities; it also distributed hundreds of thousands of household necessities, physicians' visits and scholarships, among other benefits. Among the best-known of the Foundation's many large construction projects are the Evita City development south of Buenos Aires (25,000 homes) and the "Republic of the Children", a theme park based on tales from the Brothers Grimm. Following Perón's 1955 ousting, twenty such construction projects were abandoned incomplete, and the foundation's US$290 million endowment was liquidated.

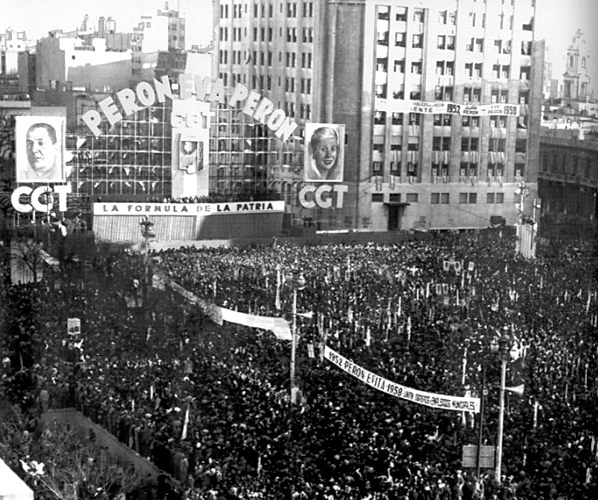
An August 1951 rally organized by the CGT for a Perón-Evita ticket failed to overcome military objections to her, and the ailing first lady withdrew.

The portion of the five-year plans which argued for full employment, public healthcare and housing, labour benefits, and raises were a result of Eva's influence on the policymaking of Perón in his first term, as historians note that initially he simply wanted to keep imperialists out of Argentina and create effective businesses. The humanitarian relief efforts embedded in the five-year plan were Eva's creation, which endeared the Peronist movement to the working-class people from which Eva had come. Her strong ties to the poor and her position as Perón's wife brought credibility to his promises during his first presidential term and ushered in a new wave of supporters. The first lady's willingness to replace the ailing Hortensio Quijano as Perón's running mate for the 1951 campaign was defeated by her own frail health and by military opposition. A 22 August rally organized for her by the CGT on Buenos Aires' wide Nueve de Julio Avenue failed to turn the tide. On 28 September, elements in the Argentine Army led by General Benjamín Andrés Menéndez attempted a coup against Perón. Although unsuccessful, the mutiny marked the end of the first lady's political hopes. She died the following July.

== Opposition and repression ==
The first to vocally oppose Perón's rule were the Argentine intelligentsia and the middle-class. University students and professors were seen as particularly troublesome. Perón fired over 2000 university professors and faculty members from all major public education institutions. These included Nobel laureate Bernardo Houssay, a physiologist, University of La Plata physicist Rafael Grinfeld, painter Emilio Pettoruti, art scholars Pío Collivadino and Jorge Romero Brest, and noted author Jorge Luis Borges who was "promoted" from his position at the Miguel Cané Library to the post of "poultry inspector" at the Buenos Aires Municipal Wholesale Market (a post he refused). Many left the country and migrated to Mexico, United States or Europe. The theologian Herold B. Weiss recalls events in the universities:

As a young student in Buenos Aires in the early 1950s, I well remember the graffiti found on many an empty wall all over town: "Build the Fatherland. Kill a Student" (Haga patria, mate a un estudiante). Perón opposed the universities, which questioned his methods and his goals. A well-remembered slogan was, Alpargatas sí, libros no ("Shoes? Yes! Books? No!") ... Universities were "intervened". In some a peronista mediocrity was appointed rector. Others were closed for years.

The labour movement that had brought Perón to power was not exempt from the iron fist. In the 1946 elections for the post of Secretary General of the CGT resulted in telephone workers' union leader Luis Gay's victory over Perón's nominee, former retail workers' leader Ángel Borlenghi – both central figures in Perón's famed 17 October comeback. The president had Luis Gay expelled from the CGT three months later, and replaced him with José Espejo, a little-known rank-and-filer who was close to the first lady.

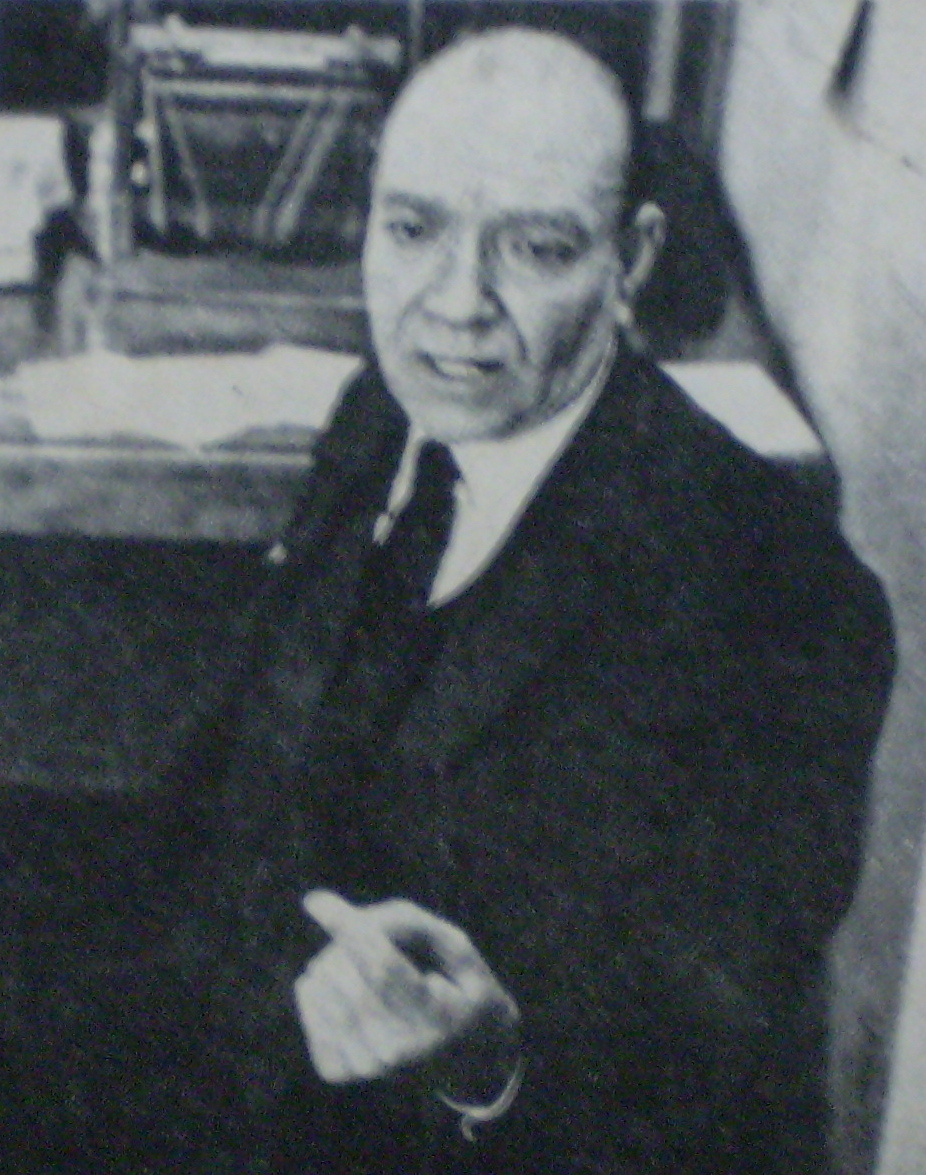
Union leader Cipriano Reyes, jailed for years for turning against Perón

The meat-packers' union leader, Cipriano Reyes, turned against Perón when he replaced the Labour Party with the Peronist Party in 1947. Organizing a strike in protest, Reyes was arrested on the charge of plotting against the lives of the president and first lady; according to Time, Reyes was contacted by two police officers posing as disloyal airforce lieutenants who convinced him of the existence of an organised conspiracy to overthrow Perón in the air force, which Reyes agreed to support. Tortured in prison, Reyes was denied parole five years later, and freed only after the regime's 1955 downfall. Cipriano Reyes was one of hundreds of Perón's opponents held at Buenos Aires' Ramos Mejía General Hospital, one of whose basements was converted into a police detention center where torture became routine.

The populist leader was intolerant of both left-wing and conservative opposition. Though he used violence, Perón preferred to deprive the opposition of their access to media. Interior Minister Borlenghi administered El Laborista, the leading official news daily. Carlos Aloe, a personal friend of Evita's, oversaw an array of leisure magazines published by Editorial Haynes, which the Peronist Party bought a majority stake in. Through the Secretary of the Media, Raúl Apold, socialist dailies such as La Vanguardia or Democracia, and conservative ones such as La Prensa or La Razón, were simply closed or expropriated in favor of the CGT or ALEA, the regime's new state media company. Intimidation of the press increased: between 1943 and 1946, 110 publications were closed down; others such as La Nación and Roberto Noble's Clarín became more cautious and self-censoring. Perón appeared more threatened by dissident artists than by opposition political figures (though UCR leader Ricardo Balbín spent most of 1950 in jail). Numerous prominent cultural and intellectual figures were imprisoned (publisher and critic Victoria Ocampo, for one) or forced into exile, among them comedian Niní Marshall, film maker Luis Saslavsky, pianist Osvaldo Pugliese and actress Libertad Lamarque, victim of a rivalry with Eva Perón.

== Fascist influence ==
The relationship between Perón, Peronism, and fascism has been widely discussed. Historian Federico Finchelstein writes: "If the question is asked if Perón was a fascist, the answer is no. But, did fascism play an important role in the ideological genesis of Peronism? Although Fascism was a central genealogy of Peronism, Perón's coming to power signaled a break from diverse traditional precedents, including fascist nacionalismo. However, the ideological continuities between Argentine fascism and Italian fascism are notable in Perón's military junta between 1943 and 1946 and the first Peronist regime (1946–1955)." The core differences that Finchelstein noted between Peronism and fascism were: "While fascism mobilized the middle classes, Peronism rallied the working class. While fascism gave war, imperialism, and racism to Europe and the world, Peronism never provoked war." He also argued that "In contrast to fascism, which used democracy to destroy itself and establish a dictatorship, Peronism originated in a military dictatorship, but established a populist authoritarian democracy. Fascism sustained itself in the ideal of violence and war as sublime values of nationality and the leader's persona. In military terms, it mobilized the masses but tended to demobilize them in social terms. Peronism inverted the terms of the fascist equation."

Assessments of Peronism as a fascist movement emerged during the 1946 Argentine general election amongst political opposition to Perón. Richard Gillespie writes:

Under the influence of European Social Democracy, Soviet Stalinism, and Argentine Liberalism, both parties [i.e. the Argentine Socialist and Communist parties], once the Nazis had invaded the USSR, characterized the Second World War as one between democracy and Fascism; then faced with the authoritarian methods of the 1943-6 regime and its refusal to enter the Allied camp until the Axis powers were doomed, Peronism, in part an offshoot of that regime, came to be branded by the traditional left as a fascist movement. This was despite the fact that Perón as Labour Secretary, had bestowed unquestionable material favour upon the growing working class .... Under these circumstances for the left to dismiss Perôn's supporters; including the mass of the workers as peronazis was not only unjust but also politically suicidal.

Carlos Fayt states that Peronism was just "an Argentine implementation of Italian fascism". Paul M. Hayes similarly concludes that "the Peronist movement produced a form of fascism that was distinctively Latin American". Instead, Felipe Pigna believes that no researcher who has deeply studied Perón should consider him a fascist. Pigna argues that Perón was only a pragmatist who took useful elements from all modern ideologies of the time; this included not only fascism but also the New Deal policies of U.S. President Franklin D. Roosevelt. To Pigna, Perón was neither fascist nor anti-fascist but simply a realist; the active intervention of the working class in politics, as he saw in those countries, was a "definitive phenomenon".

Summarizing the academic consensus on Peronism, Arnd Schneider wrote that "most authors, analysing the phenomenon in retrospect agree that the term Fascism does not accurately describe Peronism." Among others, scholars who argue that Peronism was neither fascist nor fascist-aligned include the historian Federico Finchelstein, philosopher Donald C. Hodges, and historian Daniel James. Argentine historian Cristian Buchrucker outlines main reasons why Peronism cannot be characterized fascist:

- Peronism developed in the early and mid 1940s during a period of economic growth - unlike Italian Fascism and German Nazism, which developed at a time of economic crisis;
- when Perón became Labour Secretary in 1943 and started to implement the first elements of his ideology, it did not mark the end of democracy (as in 1922's Italy and 1933's Germany). Rather, Perón succeeded the Infamous Decade, which had already seen prolonged military rule and authoritarian conservative governments, "thinly legitimized by fraudulent elections";
- Peronism was based primarily on the urban and urbanized rural working class. In contrast, the appeal of Italian Fascism and German Nazism was to the middle classes who were disillusioned with a lost World War I and economic crisis;
- while the societies of Italy, Germany and Argentina all perceived a threat of communism, only Italy and Germany had strong left-wing movements; Argentina lacked a strong left-wing movement, as socialist parties "had long been suppressed and ceased to play any tangible role", and "the working class, and the new urban poor, were without a real organizational voice" before Perón;
- the virulent, fascist territorial expansionism of Italy and Germany was absent in Peronism;
- unlike fascism, Peronism was an authoritarian, not a totalitarian political system, as Argentina never became a one-party state.

Goran Petrovic Lotina and Théo Aiolfi wrote that "Peronism was never a form of fascism during Juan Perón's first presidencies (1946–1955). Nor was Peronism fascistic in its subsequent incarnations over the past seventy-five years from the 1970s revolutionary leftist Montonero guerilla organization to the neoliberal centre-right presidency of Carlos Menem." Hodges remarked that it is a "cheap academic trick to lump together fascism (...) and Peronism". According to Hodges, Perón embraced the concept of the state as the juridical instrument that can only function within and serve the nation, but rejected the organic notions of the state assuming the dominating role by organizing the nation. Perón also prided himself in his doctrinal flexibility and elasticity, and agreed with national syndicalism of Primo de Rivera in principle, although he ultimately pursued a different political path. Hodges argues that "In view of both its gradualism and its concern for striking a balance between extremes, justicialism has more in common with the American New Deal than with either Italian fascism or German national socialism." Daniel James believes that the neo-corporatism of Peronism cannot be explained by any allegiance to fascist ideas, arguing that Perón "took his ideas principally from social catholic, communitarian ideologues rather than from any pre-1955 fascistic theory." As a response to Carlos Fayt who characterized Perónism as fascist, James P. Brennan wrote:

A close study of Peronist ideology, however, shows that the differences between it and fascism are greater than their few similarities. The central components of Justicialismo — that is, of Peronist ideology — have roots in the Social Christianism and national populism of the FORJA (the yrigoyenista, the nationalist youth wing of the Radical Party in the 1930s), and in syndicalism. Moreover, this synthesis proved to be more resilient over time than many had assumed. In Peronism's formative stage, the irrational vitalisme ("life" philosophy) and Social Darwinism of fascism had minimal and no influence, respectively. With regard to Italian corporatism, which ended up replacing the unions and democratic elections, it cannot be seriously compared with the syndicalist element in Peronism. Peronism's presumedly expansionist goals likewise are nowhere in evidence, and Sebreli's thesis does not stand up to the slightest analysis. The only similarity that can be acknowledged is the particular importance both ideologies granted to the concept of the leader. [...]

Whereas Italian fascism and German nazism destroyed the universal suffrage that had existed in those countries, Peronism on the other hand put an end to the systematic electoral fraud that had been practiced in Argentina between 1932 and 1943. There was no militarization of society, nor was public spending directed toward a massive arms buildup. Economic policy was dirigiste, but if state planning is an indicator of fascism, one would have to conclude that Mexico under Cardenas and Great Britain under the Labour governments. The Peronist governments of 1946-1955 and 1973-1976 directed their efforts toward distributive and industrializing policies.

According to Pablo Bradbury, while there was a great divergence between formal Peronist ideology and the wider Peronist movement, the ideology of Perón was not fascist; Bradbury argues that nationalism of Peronism was not rooted in a sense of expansion or imperialist greatness, but was left-wing nationalism that "found its most prominent expressions in anti-imperialism, whether against British economic dominance or US political interference." He also remarked that "Peronism originated in a military dictatorship, but established a populist authoritarian democracy". The democratizing movement within Peronism was significant, as it empowered previously marginalized groups – Peronism introduced universal suffrage and reshaped the definition of Argentinian citizenship and national identity. Bradbury also points to the racist rhetoric of middle-class and upper-class opponents of Peronism, who called Peronists cabecitas negras ("little black heads"), portraying the Peronist masses as prone to criminality, unsophisticated, dark-skinned and of immigrant background.

Michael Goebel likewise points to the inclusive character of Peronism that conflicted with the exclusive nature of fascism – non-Spanish surnames were far more prevalent amongst the Peronist leadership than among any other political movement in Argentina, and "even in the more marginal provinces, Peronist politicians often had rather recent immigrant origins." Cas Mudde stated that "it is not an exaggeration to state that [Perón's] populism in general propelled democracy forward, both by encouraging democratic behavior and by enrolling lower class groups and their quest for social justice in political life."

In 1938, Perón was sent on a diplomatic mission to Europe. During this time, he became enamoured of the Italian fascist model. Perón's admiration for Benito Mussolini is well documented. He credited both Italian fascism and German national socialism for creating a command economy that "harmonized the interests of workers", and his exact words in that respect were as follows:

From Germany I went back to Italy and studied the matter. My knowledge of Italian enabled me, I would say, to penetrate deeply into the foundations of the system, and that is how I discovered something which from that social point of view was very interesting to me. Italian fascism brought the popular organisations into effective participation in national life, from which the people had always been excluded. Until Mussolini's rise to power, the nation was on one side and the worker on the other, and the latter had no part in it. I discovered the resurgence of the corporations and studied them in depth.

— Juan Perón

However, Perón also cautioned that only some elements of European fascism can be praised, as the Italian and German regimes otherwise led to "administrative centralization carried to the extreme; the absorption of all private or semiprivate entities (cultural association, universities, etc.); absolute militarism; a closed and directed economy." Robert D. Classweller argued: "Peronism was not fascism. Some of Peronism's adherents had a fascist outlook and mentality. Perón himself admired Mussolini and the idea of the corporate state. But all this was relatively superficial. No fascist society was ever erected on a mass base of laboring and dispossessed hordes. In its own descriptions of identity, Peronism rejected the Fascist parallel. It was more intimately grounded in the national history and ethos than was any European fascism. The structure of the Peronist state after the constitutional amendments of 1949 remained that of the old Argentine democratic order."

Perón subverted freedom of speech and silenced vocal dissidents through actions such as nationalizing the broadcasting system and monopolizing the supply of newspaper print. At times, Perón also resorted to tactics such as imprisoning opposition politicians and journalists, including Radical Civic Union leader Ricardo Balbín; and shutting down opposition papers, such as La Prensa.

However, most scholars argue against seeing Peronism as dictatorial or totalitarian. Crassweller wrote on Peronism: "Peronism was not a dictatorship. As the American embassy stated in April 1948, ". . . Peron is far from being a dictator in the sense of having absolute authority." The army concerned itself with foreign policy. Totalitarian methods frequently appeared in the operations of the police, or in repression of the press, or in restrictions imposed on the conduct of opposition, but this falls short of a dictatorship. Perón often had to bargain for support, to trim his sails on the timing of initiatives, and to balance interests that could not be overridden. Strong and authoritarian and sometimes oppressive, yes. But not really dictatorial." Paul Corner and Jie-Hyun Lim similarly argued: "Peronism (like early Cold War populism as a whole) was not a dictatorship but an authoritarian form of democracy." Paola Raffaelli wrote: "Although some authors suggest that Peronism was a form of fascism, this was not the case. He was democratically elected and other parties and the Parliament were not banned, it did not pursue an ideology apart from a less-dependant nation, and Perón was in power three times for ten years within a twenty-eight years period of time."

Some historians also note that accusations of fascism against Perón originated from Anglo-American circles, who saw Peronism as a threat to their interests in Argentina. Pablo Aguirre argued: "Traditionally Britain in general and the Labour Party in particular have taken little interest in the affairs of Latin America. For years after the Second World War the continent was strictly terra incognita. Analysis based on ignorance was often faulty. General Peron, for example, who "stole" Britain's railways and increased the price of "British" beef, was regarded as the reincarnation of Mussolini." Judith Alder Hellman also noted that those who accused Perón of fascism tend to equate communism and fascism as similar or identical ideologies - Spruille Braden, the Assistant Secretary of State for Western Hemisphere Affairs of the United States who spearheaded a campaign to portray Peronism as a fascist movement, later "frankly admitted that he could never see the difference between Fascism and Communism".

=== Protection of Nazi war criminals ===
After World War II, Argentina became a haven for Nazi war criminals, with explicit protection from Perón, who even shortly before his death commented on the Nuremberg Trials:

In Nuremberg at that time something was taking place that I personally considered a disgrace and an unfortunate lesson for the future of humanity. I became certain that the Argentine people also considered the Nuremberg process a disgrace, unworthy of the victors, who behaved as if they hadn't been victorious. Now we realize that they [the Allies] deserved to lose the war.

Author Uki Goñi alleges that Axis Power collaborators, including Pierre Daye, met with Perón at Casa Rosada, the President's official executive mansion. The Swiss Chief of Police Heinrich Rothmund and the Croatian priest Krunoslav Draganović also helped organize the ratline.

An investigation of 22,000 documents by the DAIA in 1997 discovered that the network was managed by Rodolfo Freude who had an office in the Casa Rosada and was close to Eva Perón's brother, Juan Duarte. According to Ronald Newton, Ludwig Freude, Rodolfo's father, was probably the local representative of the Office Three secret service headed by Joachim von Ribbentrop, with probably more influence than the German ambassador Edmund von Thermann. He had met Perón in the 1930s, and had contacts with Generals Juan Pistarini, Domingo Martínez, and José Molina. Ludwig Freude's house became the meeting place for Nazis and Argentine military officers supporting the Axis. In 1943, he traveled with Perón to Europe to attempt an arms deal with Germany.

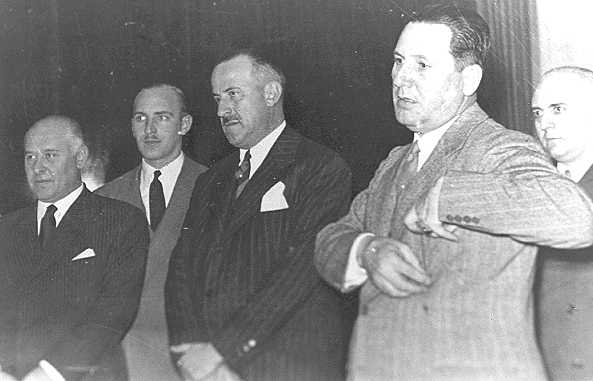
Nazi exile network principal Rodolfo Freude (2nd from left) and President Perón (2nd from right), who appointed Freude Director of the Argentine Intelligence Secretariat

After the war, Ludwig Freude was investigated over his connection to possible looted Nazi art, cash and precious metals on deposit at two Argentine banks, Banco Germanico and Banco Tornquist. But on 6 September 1946, the Freude investigation was terminated by presidential decree.

Examples of Nazis and collaborators who relocated to Argentina include Emile Dewoitine, who arrived in May 1946 and worked on the Pulqui jet; Erich Priebke, who arrived in 1947; Josef Mengele in 1949; Adolf Eichmann in 1950; Austrian representative of the Škoda arms manufacturer in Spain Reinhard Spitzy; Charles Lescat, editor of Je Suis Partout in Vichy France; and SS functionary Ludwig Lienhardt.

Many members of the notorious Croatian Ustaše (including their leader, Ante Pavelić) took refuge in Argentina, as did Milan Stojadinović, the former Serbian Prime Minister of monarchist Yugoslavia. In 1946 Stojadinović went to Rio de Janeiro, and then to Buenos Aires, where he was reunited with his family. Stojadinović spent the rest of his life as presidential advisor on economic and financial affairs to governments in Argentina and founded the financial newspaper El Economista in 1951, which still carries his name on its masthead.

A Croatian priest, Krunoslav Draganović, organizer of the San Girolamo ratline, was authorized by Perón to assist Nazi operatives to come to Argentina and evade prosecution in Europe after World War II, in particular the Ustaše. Ante Pavelić became a security advisor of Perón. After Perón was overthrown in 1955, Pavelić, fearing extradition to Yugoslavia, left for Francoist Spain in 1957.

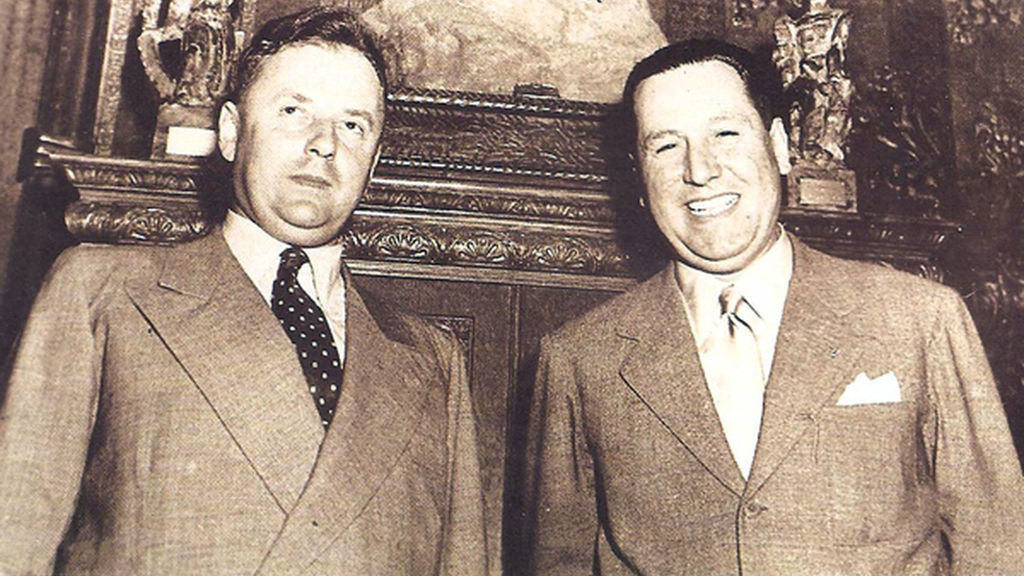
Ronald Richter (left) with Juan Perón (right).

As in the United States (Operation Paperclip), Argentina also welcomed displaced German scientists such as Kurt Tank and Ronald Richter. Some of these refugees took important roles in Perón's Argentina, such as French collaborationist Jacques de Mahieu, who became an ideologue of the Peronist movement, before becoming mentor to a Roman Catholic nationalist youth group in the 1960s. Belgian collaborationist Pierre Daye became editor of a Peronist magazine. Rodolfo Freude, Ludwig's son, became Perón's chief of presidential intelligence in his first term.

Recently, Goñi's research, drawing on investigations in Argentine, Swiss, American, British and Belgian government archives, as well as numerous interviews and other sources, was detailed in The Real ODESSA: Smuggling the Nazis to Perón's Argentina (2002), showing how escape routes known as ratlines were used by former NSDAP members and like-minded people to escape trial and judgment. Goñi places particular emphasis on the part played by Perón's government in organizing the ratlines, as well as documenting the aid of Swiss and Vatican authorities in their flight. The Argentine consulate in Barcelona gave false passports to fleeing Nazi war criminals and collaborationists. Recently declassified files from Brazil and Chile reveal that during WWII Péron sold 10,000 blank Argentine passports to ODESSA – the organisation set up to protect former SS men in the event of defeat.

Tomás Eloy Martínez, writer and professor of Latin American studies at Rutgers University, wrote that Juan Perón allowed Nazis into the country in hopes of acquiring advanced German technology developed during the war. Martínez also noted that Eva Perón played no part in allowing Nazis into the country. However, one of Eva's bodyguards was in fact an ex-Nazi commando named Otto Skorzeny, who had met Juan on occasion.

Perón's biographer Jill Hedges wrote on Perón's attitude and actions regarding the Nazi immigration to Argentina:

Unquestionably the Perón government, like others elsewhere, received former Nazis after the war, not least in a bid to attract skilled scientists and technicians; Perón himself would describe this as 'good business', saying 'what costs us a plane ticket cost Germany millions of marks invested in training those scientists and technicians'. Many also found their way to Argentina through the offices of the Vatican and, in some cases, through the willingness of some Argentine diplomats in Europe to sell them Argentine passports. Later investigations in the 1990s would identify 180 Nazis and collaborators who entered Argentina after the war, of whom around 50 were identified as war criminals, notably including Adolf Eichmann and Josef Mengele (with whom Perón had at least one conversation about his genetic experiments). This represented indifference rather than Nazi ideology on Perón or the government's part.

=== Jewish and German communities of Argentina ===
The German Argentine community in Argentina is the third-largest immigrant group in the country, after the ethnic Spanish and the Italians. The German Argentine community predates Juan Perón's presidency, and began during the political unrest related to the 19th-century unification of Germany. Laurence Levine writes that Perón found 20th-century German civilization too "rigid" and had a "distaste" for it. Crassweller writes that while Juan Perón preferred Argentine culture, with which he felt a spiritual affinity, he was "pragmatic" in dealing with the diverse populace of Argentina.

While Juan Perón's Argentina allowed many Nazi criminals to take refuge in the country following World War II, the society also accepted more Jewish immigrants than any other country in Latin America. Today Argentina has a population of more than 200,000 Jewish citizens, the largest in Latin America, the third-largest in the Americas, and the sixth-largest in the world.

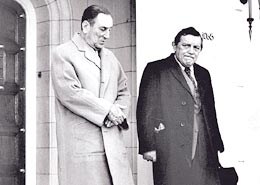
Juan Perón and José Ber Gelbard

Fraser and Navarro write that Juan Perón was a complicated man who over the years stood for many different, often contradictory, things. In the book Inside Argentina from Perón to Menem author Laurence Levine, former president of the US-Argentine Chamber of Commerce, writes, "although anti-Semitism existed in Argentina, Perón's own views and his political associations were not anti-Semitic...." Perón appointed several Jewish Argentinians as government advisers, such as his economic advisor, José Ber Gelbard. He favoured the creation of institutions such as New Zion (Nueva Sión), the Argentine-Jewish Institute of Culture and Information, led by Simón Mirelman, and the Argentine-Israeli Chamber of Commerce. Also, he named Rabbi Amran Blum as the first Jewish professor of philosophy in the National University of Buenos Aires. Perón appointed Pablo Mangel, a Jew, as Argentina's first ambassador to Israel. In 1946 Perón's government allowed Jewish army privates to celebrate their holidays, which was intended to foster Jewish integration.

Perón sought to recruit the Jewish community into his Peronist support base as to broaden the support for his "New Argentina" and also dispel the accusations of fascism.

In 1947, Perón founded Organización Israelita Argentina (OIA), the Jewish wing of the Peronist Party, in attempt to promote his ideology amongst the Jewish community. While OIA failed to attract much support of Argentinian Jews, it became an intermediary between Perón and the Jewish community. Argentinian Jews entered dialogue with Perón through IOA, securing favors and concessions. Jewish newspapers in Argentina particularly praised the socialist nature of Perón's planned economy, leading to limited expressions of support. Peronism allowed the Jewish community to actively participate in the political life of Argentina; Jewish writer Isaías Lerner remarked: "The triumph of Perón meant a greater participation of the [Jewish] community in the political arena. For the first time in Argentina's political history, a political party courted our community."

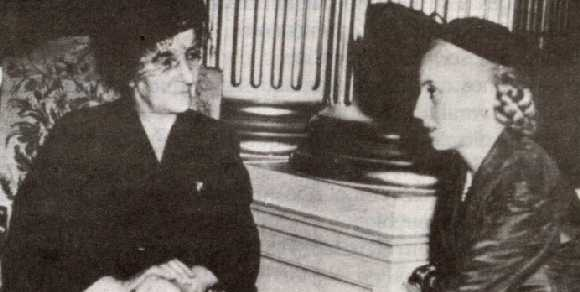
Golda Meir talks with Evita Perón on Meir's visit to Argentina, 1951.

Argentina signed a generous commercial agreement with Israel that granted favourable terms for Israeli acquisitions of Argentine commodities, and the Eva Perón Foundation sent significant humanitarian aid. In 1951 during their visit to Buenos Aires, Chaim Weizmann and Golda Meir expressed their gratitude for this aid.

U.S. Ambassador George S. Messersmith visited Argentina in 1947 during the first term of Juan Perón. Messersmith noted, "There is not as much social discrimination against Jews here as there is right in New York or in most places at home..." According to Raanan Rein, "Fewer anti-Semitic incidences took place in Argentina during Perón's rule than during any other period in the 20th century."

== Socialist influences ==
There are interpretations of Perón's views and policies as a variant of socialism; such view grew in popularity after Perón's exile and later death, as many historians and political scientists analyzed whether Perón was a socialist or desired a socialist system. Peronism was variously described as a variant of nationalist socialism, paternalistic socialism, non-Marxist socialism, and Catholic socialism. Political scientists supporting this view note that Perón created a planned and heavily regulated economy, with "a massive public sector of nationalized industries and social services" that was "redistributive in nature" and prioritized workers' benefits and the empowerment of trade unions. Perón's close relationship with a socialist leader Juan José Arévalo and his extensive support for the Bolivian National Revolution are also considered arguments in favor of this view. Additionally, despite promoting a concept of a "Third Way" between the 'imperialisms' of the United States and Soviet Union, Perón supported and became a close ally of the Cuban Revolution, Salvador Allende of Chile, and the People's Republic of China. Perón's ideology is considered a genuine socialist ideology by some Marxist writers such as Samir Amin, José María Aricó, Dieter Boris, and Donald C. Hodges.

According to the political scientist Peter Ranis, Peronism is a part of the Argentine left-wing and socialist tradition, its contradictory nature notwithstanding. Ranis criticizes the view that Peronism should not be considered socialist, and considers it outdated and long disproven. Ranis wrote:

It has been a long time since anyone has expressed such views... to tear Peronism bodily from the leftist tradition rather than accept its role as a populist alliance that includes labor support and leftist propositions on a number of social, economic, and foreign policy issues, positions that often coincide with those of traditional Marxist-Leninist political parties. The difference is that with Peronism the workers must share influence with other socioeconomic groups, but this distinction does not exclude Peronism from the tradition of mass movements of the progressive left. I would be the last to deny the gulf between Peronism and Argentine Marxism-Leninism, but to deny Peronism as a genuinely socialist form of populism is to ignore the great Argentine debate on the left among all those sectors from Peron's exile up to the present. [...] To most of the workers, the "patria socialista" was the "patria peronista."

Che Guevara, despite being born in an anti-Peronist family, considered Peronism "a kind of indigenous Latin American socialism with which the Cuban Revolution could side". Perón also enjoyed the support of other socialist leaders. In his autobiography My Life: A Spoken Autobiography, Fidel Castro wrote of Perón:

There have been many heroic revolutionary feats on the part of military men in the twentieth century. Juan Domingo Perón, in Argentina, was also from a military background. (...) Perón made some mistakes: he offended the Argentine oligarchy, humiliated it - he nationalized its theatre and other symbols of the wealthy class - but the oligarchy's political and economic power remained intact, and at the right moment it brought Peron down, with the complicity and aid of the United States. Perón's greatness lay in the fact that he appealed to that rich country's reserves and resources and did all he could to improve the living conditions of the workers. That social class, which was always grateful and loyal to him, made Perón an idol, to the end of his life.

Perón was also regarded positively by Mao Zedong. When visiting pro-Perón Maoist militias in Argentina, Mao reportedly stated: "If I were a young Argentinian, I would be a Peronist." This quote was promoted by the Revolutionary Communist Party of Argentina, who advertized their movement by stating: "If Mao had been Argentine, he would have been a Peronist." Perón responded in kind, writing that "Marxism is not only not in contradiction with the Peronist Movement, but complements it." Perón also argued in his speech from 12 November 1972: "We must not be frightened by the word socialism". Perón stated that "if he had been Chinese he would be a Maoist", and on his trip to Communist Romania he concluded that "the regime in that country is similar, in many respects, to Justicialism".

Perón variously described his ideology as justicialism or socialismo nacional cristiano - "Christian national socialism", which Perón used as an unclear term that he used to discuss diverse government systems that in his belief corresponded to the will of the people while also considering the unique circumstances and culture of each nation. According to Richard Gillespie, this expression meant to convey "a 'national' road to socialism, understood as a system of economic socialization and popular power respectful of specific national conditions and traditions." Perón justified his notion of 'national socialism' by arguing that "nationalism need not be at odds with socialism", given that "both, in the end, far from being antagonistic, can be united with a common goal of liberation of peoples and men". In 1972, this was described as "the national expression of socialism, insofar as it represents, expresses and develops in action the aspirations of the popular masses and the Argentine working class". By left-wing Peronist groups, Peronism was regarded as a form of autochthonous socialism that was to grant "political and economic emancipation" to the workers of Argentina. In July 1971, Perón wrote:

For us Justicialist Government is that which serves the people . . . our revolutionary process articulates individual and collective [needs], it is one form of socialism. Therefore a fair socialism, like the one Justicialism wants, and that is why it is called Justicialism, is that in which a community develops in agreement with [the community's] intrinsic conditions.

Perón described his "national socialism" as "a definitive overcoming of foreign imperialism" and "last frontier for achieving political and economic emancipation in Argentina". He stated that "that word that sounds so strange at times, national socialism, lost its strangeness and acquired significance as a vehicle for eradicating the oppression of capital". On capitalism, he claimed: "The history of Peronism had confirmed that, within the capitalist system, there is no solution for the workers"; Peronist national socialism in his understanding had as its aim "to put society at the service of man and man at the service of society; to rescue moral and ethical values, honesty and humility, as the fundamental axis of this stage; to socialise the means of production, nationalise banking, carry out a profound cultural reform, hand over the administration of the land to those who work it through a profound agrarian revolution, nationalise foreign trade." The nationalism of Peronism was to be based on the liberation of "peoples subjugated by the imperial powers" and to exercise the demand for sovereignty through "people's representatives" managed by Perón; he also described imperialism as a part of a deeper problem which were the "limitations of capitalism in sustaining its structure of domination."

Most historians argue that socialism was at least one of the political inspiration of Perón. Federico Finchelstein classified Perón's populism as "the synthesis of nationalism and non-Marxist Christian socialism". Argentinian historian Cristian Buchrucker saw Perón's ideology a mixture of nationalist, populist and Christian socialist elements, while Humberto Cucchetti stated that Peronism was an accumulation of political concepts such as "nationalist socialism, trade unionist tradition, nationalisation of the middle strata, charismatic leadership, revolutionary prophetism, Third Worldism, justicialist ethics, Christian utopia, popular mobilisation and outlines of democratisation". Buchrucker states that while Perón's movement was in the state of constant struggle between competing ideological movements between it, it never abandoned trade unions and its "revolutionary rhetoric that claimed to assume directly the features of a nationalist liberation movement". Jerzy J. Wiatr believed that Perón adhered to what can be described as "a combination of socialist and corporatist ideas with a strong nationalist accent." Emilio Ocampo claimed that Perón "incorporated revolutionary Marxist elements and rhetoric, always appealing to a strong nationalist sentiment."

Political scientist Rafael di Tella described Peronism as a combination of political Catholicism with socialism. Similarly, historian Raanan Rein classified Peronism as a nationalistic populism that was shaped by Catholic social teaching and socialist currents. Others propose to instead see Peronism as a combination of nationalism with socialism - Peter Ranis wrote that Perón "fused an indigenous socialism with Argentine nationalism through Peronism". Lily Balloffet noted that Perón's policies were very similar to that of Gamal Abdel Nasser, and that both regimes were notable for anti-imperialist nationalism, the 'Third Position' philosophy of non-alignment in the Cold War and "socialist" economic policies. Gary B. Madison states that Perón's policies represented populist socialism.

American historian Garrett John Roberts saw Peronism as an "ultranationalist socialist labor movement", and argued that Perón pursued "socialist and nationalist" policies, noting that the Perón's Five Year Plan followed the pattern of Soviet economic programs under Joseph Stalin. Alberto Spektorowski concluded that Perón accurately described his ideology as 'national socialism'; to Spektorowski, Perón synthesized "national integralism, anti-imperialism and social justice". He also noted that Perón was shaped by left-wing nationalism as well as syndicalism, and formed a revolutionary movement in the sense that in Argentina, "the ideological confrontation was between nationalism represented by Peronism and the old conservative order."

According to Ronaldo Munck, "many observers even saw Perón himself as some kind of nationalist, socialist leader, if not as Argentina's Lenin." On similarities and differences of Perón and the revolutionary wing of Peronism, Munck wrote that Perón's later conflict with the left wing of his movement was not ideological, but was more based on power politics: "The purely anti-imperialist and anti-oligarchic political programme of the Montoneros ("national socialism") was not incompatible with Peron's economic project of "national reconstruction", but their power of mass mobilisation was." Lester A. Sobel also argues that in regards to his eventual conflict with the Peronist left, "Perón was less opposed to socialism than to the rifts within his movement, caused in part by antagonism between Marxists and non-Marxists".

In his political science book Political Man: The Social Bases of Politics, Seymour Martin Lipset noted that "Peronism, much like Marxist parties, has been oriented toward the poorer classes, primarily urban workers but also the more impoverished rural population." He characterized Peronism as an "anticapitalist populist nationalism which appeals to the lower strata". Lipset argued that Peronism can be seen as a left-wing equivalent of fascism: "If Peronism is considered a variant of fascism, then it is a fascism of the left because it is based on the social strata who would otherwise turn to socialism or Communism as an outlet for their frustrations." He classified Peronism as a "form of "left" extremism".

Peronism was also described as a form of Third World socialism, or a distinctly Argentinian kind of a populist, non-Marxist socialism akin to African socialism and Arab socialism. German political scientist Lisa Bogerts considers Peronism a "broader historical movement of communism and socialism", representing a movement different from the mainstream socialist movements in Argentina such as the Argentine Socialist Party. Similarly, Donald C. Hodges described Peronism as a "peculiar brand of socialism" that heavily incorporated elements of nationalism and Christian social teaching. Writing on Perón, Charles D. Ameringer argued that "The rise to power of Juan Perón in 1943 was not the end of the socialist impulse in Argentina; it was the culmination" and added that "much of the social legislation either introduced or implemented by Perón . . . originated with the Socialist Party."

== Second term (1952–1955) ==
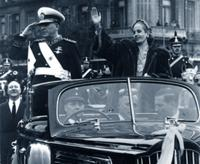
Perón and the ailing Evita during his second inaugural parade, June 1952. Eva died the following month.

Facing only token UCR and Socialist Party opposition and despite being unable to field his popular wife, Eva, as a running mate, Perón was re-elected in 1951 by a margin of over 30%. This election was the first to have extended suffrage to Argentine women and the first in Argentina to be televised: Perón was inaugurated on Channel 7 public television that October. He began his second term in June 1952 with serious economic problems, however, compounded by a severe drought that helped lead to a US$500 million trade deficit (depleting reserves).

Perón called employers and unions to a Productivity Congress to regulate social conflict through dialogue, but the conference failed without reaching an agreement. Divisions among Peronists intensified, and the President's worsening mistrust led to the forced resignation of numerous valuable allies, notably Buenos Aires Province Governor Domingo Mercante. Again on the defensive, Perón accelerated generals' promotions and extended them pay hikes and other benefits. He also accelerated landmark construction projects slated for the CGT or government agencies; among these was the 41-story and 141 m (463 ft) high Alas Building (transferred to the Air Force by a later regime).

Opposition to Perón grew bolder following Eva Perón's death on 26 July 1952. On 15 April 1953, a terrorist group (never identified) detonated two bombs in a public rally at Plaza de Mayo, killing 7 and injuring 95. Amid the chaos, Perón exhorted the crowd to take reprisals; they made their way to their adversaries' gathering places, the Socialist Party headquarters and the aristocratic Jockey Club (both housed in magnificent turn-of-the-century Beaux-Arts buildings), and burned them to the ground.

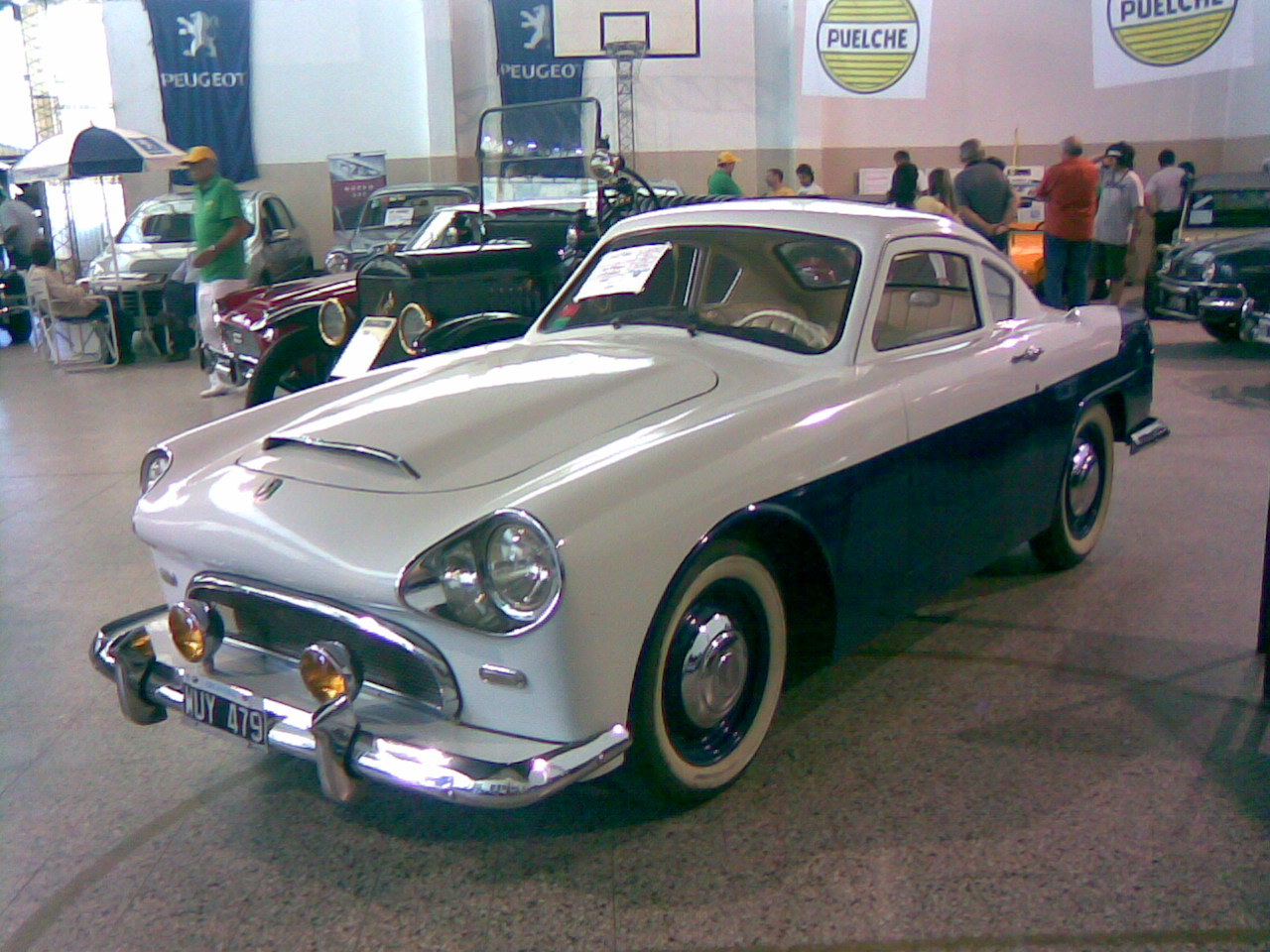
Designed and manufactured in Argentina, the Justicialist was part of Perón's effort to develop a local auto industry.

A stalemate of sorts ensued between Perón and his opposition and, despite austerity measures taken late in 1952 to remedy the country's unsustainable trade deficit, the president remained generally popular. In March 1954, Perón called a vice-presidential election to replace the late Hortensio Quijano, which his candidate won by a nearly two-to-one margin. Given what he felt was as solid a mandate as ever and with inflation in single digits and the economy on a more secure footing, Perón ventured into a new policy: the creation of incentives designed to attract foreign investment.

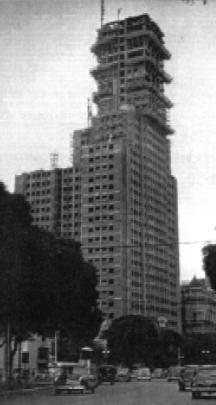
The Alas Building under construction

Drawn to an economy with the highest standard of living in Latin America and a new steel mill in San Nicolás de los Arroyos, automakers FIAT and Kaiser Motors responded to the initiative by breaking ground on new facilities in the city of Córdoba, as did the freight truck division of Daimler-Benz, the first such investments since General Motors' Argentine assembly line opened in 1926. Perón also signed an important exploration contract with Standard Oil of California, in May 1955, consolidating his new policy of substituting the two largest sources of that era's chronic trade deficits (imported petroleum and motor vehicles) with local production brought in through foreign investment. Arturo Frondizi, who had been the centrist Radical Civic Union's 1951 vice-presidential nominee, publicly condemned what he considered to be an anti-patriotic decision; as president three years later, however, he himself signed exploration contracts with foreign oil companies.

As 1954 drew to a close, Perón unveiled reforms far more controversial to the normally conservative Argentine public, the legalization of divorce and of prostitution. The Roman Catholic Church's Argentine leaders, whose support of Perón's government had been steadily waning since the advent of the Eva Perón Foundation, were now open antagonists of the man they called "the tyrant." Though much of Argentina's media had, since 1950, been either controlled or monitored by the administration, lurid pieces on his alleged relationship with an underage girl named Nélida Rivas (known as Nelly), filled the gossip pages. Pressed by reporters on whether his supposed new paramour was, as the magazines claimed, thirteen years of age, the fifty-nine-year-old Perón responded that he was "not superstitious." Later, while on exile, Perón commented on Nelly: "That young lady I met was a girl who attended the UES like many others. She is a child, and as a man I could not or cannot see in her anything other than what she is: a child. Because of my age, because of my experience, you can be sure that I did not transgress moral codes."

It is unknown whether the relationship between Nelly Rivas and Perón really took place. Victoria Allison considers the story a part of smear campaign against Perón conducted by the military junta of Pedro Eugenio Aramburu, which included similar charges and rumours about Perón. Silvana G. Ferreyra notes that despite the story being a popular talking point amongst anti-Peronist circles, the Argentinian public at large did not believe the allegations, writing: "As the years went by, the persistence of the Peronist identity among the popular classes was a clear sign of the ineffectiveness of these denunciations." Perón's biographer, Jill Hedges, argues that "the concept was hardly novel" in Argentina, and rumours of political figures having affairs with young girls in domestic service or similar positions were common, which did not make the story stand out amongst the other anti-Peronist allegations of the smear campaign. Perón was also accused of having sexual encounters with film stars during the 1954 Mar del Plata International Film Festival, and photos of him with the members of the women's branch of Secondary Students' Union (Spanish: Unión de Estudiantes Secundarios, UES) that Rivas belonged to sparked moralistic critique already before the allegation of his romance with her was made. Anti-Peronist media mocked Perón for posing with the women of the UES, claiming that he was trying to "forget the irreparable absence [of Eva Perón]"; shortly afterwards, gossip of Perón's alleged relationship with Rivas appeared for the first time.

Before long, however, the president's humor on the subject ran out and, following the expulsion of two Catholic priests he believed to be behind his recent image problems, a 15 June 1955 declaration of the Sacred Consistorial Congregation (not of Pope Pius XII himself, who alone had authority to excommunicate a head of state) was interpreted as declaring Perón excommunicated. The following day, Perón called for a rally of support on the Plaza de Mayo, a time-honored custom among Argentine presidents during a challenge. However, as he spoke before a crowd of thousands, Navy fighter jets flew overhead and dropped bombs into the crowded square below before seeking refuge in Uruguay.

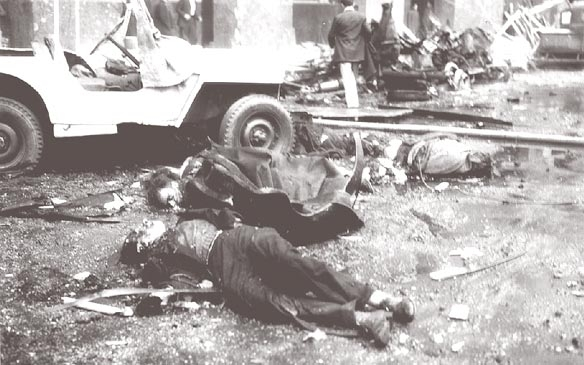
Scene in the Plaza de Mayo following a failed coup attempt against Perón, 16 June 1955. He was deposed three months later.

The incident, part of a coup attempt against Perón, killed 364 people and was, from a historical perspective, the only air assault ever on Argentine soil, as well as a portent of the mayhem that Argentine society would suffer in the 1970s. It moreover touched off a wave of reprisals on the part of Peronists. Reminiscent of the incidents in 1953, Peronist crowds ransacked eleven Buenos Aires churches, including the Metropolitan Cathedral. On 16 September 1955, a nationalist Catholic group from both the Army and Navy, led by General Eduardo Lonardi, General Pedro E. Aramburu, and Admiral Isaac Rojas, led a revolt from Córdoba. They took power in a coup three days later, which they named Revolución Libertadora (the "Liberating Revolution"). Perón barely escaped with his life and fled on the gunboat ARP Paraguay provided by Paraguayan leader Alfredo Stroessner, up the Paraná River. On his way to the port, Perón's car broke down which forced him to ask an astonished bus driver to help tow it through the rain.

At that point Argentina was more politically polarized than it had been since 1880. The landowning elites and other conservatives pointed to an exchange rate that had rocketed from 4 to 30 pesos per dollar and consumer prices that had risen nearly fivefold. Employers and moderates generally agreed, qualifying that with the fact the economy had grown by over 40% (the best showing since the 1920s). The underprivileged and humanitarians looked back upon the era as one in which real wages grew by over a third and better working conditions arrived alongside benefits like pensions, health care, paid vacations and the construction of record numbers of needed schools, hospitals, works of infrastructure and housing.

== Exile (1955–1973) ==
The new military regime went to great lengths to destroy both Juan and Eva Perón's reputation, putting up public exhibits of what they maintained was the Peróns' scandalously sumptuous taste for antiques, jewelry, roadsters, yachts and other luxuries. In addition, they highlighted the association between Peronism and Nazism and accused Perón of having committed genocide. They also accused other Peronist leaders of corruption; but, ultimately, though many were prosecuted, none were convicted. The junta's first leader, Eduardo Lonardi, appointed a Civilian Advisory Board. However, its preference for a gradual approach to de-Perónization helped lead to Lonardi's ousting, though most of the board's recommendations withstood the new president's scrutiny.

Lonardi's replacement, Lieutenant-General Pedro Aramburu, outlawed the mere mention of Juan or Eva Perón's names under Decree Law 4161/56. Throughout Argentina, Peronism and the very display of Peronist mementos was banned. Partly in response to these and other excesses, Peronists and moderates in the army organized a counter-coup against Aramburu, in June 1956. Possessing an efficient intelligence network, however, Aramburu foiled the plan, having the plot's leader, General Juan José Valle, and 26 others executed. Aramburu turned to similarly drastic means in trying to rid the country of the spectre of the Peróns, themselves. Eva Perón's corpse was removed from its display at CGT headquarters and ordered hidden under another name in a modest grave in Milan, Italy. Perón himself, for the time residing in Caracas, Venezuela at the kindness of ill-fated President Marcos Pérez Jiménez, suffered a number of attempted kidnappings and assassinations ordered by Aramburu.

Continuing to exert considerable direct influence over Argentine politics despite the ongoing ban of the Justicialist Party as Argentina geared for the 1958 elections, Perón instructed his supporters to cast their ballots for the moderate Arturo Frondizi, a splinter candidate within the Peronists' largest opposition party, the Radical Civic Union (UCR). Frondizi went on to defeat the better-known (but, more anti-Peronist) UCR leader, Ricardo Balbín. Perón backed a "Popular Union" (UP) in 1962, and when its candidate for governor of Buenos Aires Province (Andrés Framini) was elected, Frondizi was forced to resign by the military. Unable to secure a new alliance, Perón advised his followers to cast blank ballots in the 1963 elections, demonstrating direct control over one fifth of the electorate.

Perón's stay in Venezuela had been cut short by the 1958 ousting of General Pérez Jiménez. In Panama, he met the nightclub singer María Estela Martínez (known as "Isabel"). Eventually settling in Madrid, Spain under the protection of Francisco Franco, he married Isabel in 1961 and was admitted back into the Catholic Church in 1963. Following a failed December 1964 attempt to return to Buenos Aires, he sent his wife to Argentina in 1965, to meet political dissidents and advance Perón's policy of confrontation and electoral boycotts. She organized a meeting in the house of Bernardo Alberte, Perón's delegate and sponsor of various left-wing Peronist movements such as the CGT de los Argentinos (CGTA), an offshoot of the umbrella CGT union. During Isabel's visit, adviser Raúl Lastiri introduced her to his father-in-law, José López Rega. A policeman with an interest in the occult, he won Isabel's trust through their common dislike of Jorge Antonio, a prominent Argentine industrialist and the Peronist movement's main financial backer during their perilous 1960s. Accompanying her to Spain, López Rega worked for Perón's security before becoming the couple's personal secretary. A return of the Popular Union (UP) in 1965 and their victories in congressional elections that year helped lead to the overthrow of the moderate President Arturo Illia, and to the return of dictatorship.

Perón became increasingly unable to control the CGT, itself. Though he had the support of its Secretary General, José Alonso, others in the union favored distancing the CGT from the exiled leader. Chief among them was Steel and Metalworkers Union head Augusto Vandor. Vandor challenged Perón from 1965 to 1968 by defying Perón's call for an electoral boycott (leading the UP to victories in the 1965 elections), and with mottos such as "Peronism without Perón" and "to save Perón, one has to be against Perón." Dictator Juan Carlos Onganía's continued repression of labour demands, however, helped lead to Vandor's rapprochement with Perón – a development cut short by Vandor's as-yet unsolved 1969 murder. Labour agitation increased; the CGTA, in particular, organized opposition to the dictatorship between 1968 and 1972, and it would have an important role in the May–June 1969 Cordobazo insurrection.

Perón began courting the far left during Onganía's dictatorship. In his book La Hora de los Pueblos (1968), Perón enunciated the main principles of his purported new Tricontinental political vision:

Mao is at the head of Asia, Nasser of Africa, De Gaulle of the old Europe and Castro of Latin America.

— Juan Perón, La Hora de los Pueblos

He supported the more militant unions and maintained close links with the Montoneros, a far-left Catholic Peronist group. On 1 June 1970, the Montoneros kidnapped and assassinated former anti-Peronist President Pedro Aramburu in retaliation for the June 1956 mass execution of a Peronist uprising against the junta. In 1971, he sent two letters to the film director Octavio Getino, one congratulating him for his work with Fernando Solanas and Gerardo Vallejo, in the Grupo Cine Liberación, and another concerning two film documentaries, La Revolución Justicialista and Actualización política y doctrinaria.

He also cultivated ties with ultraconservatives and the extreme right. He supported the leader of the conservative wing of the UCR, his erstwhile prisoner Ricardo Balbín, against competition from within the UCR itself. Members of the right-wing Tacuara Nationalist Movement, considered the first Argentine guerrilla group, also turned towards him. Founded in the early 1960s, the Tacuaras were a fascist, anti-Semitic and conformist group founded on the model of Primo de Rivera's Falange, and at first strongly opposed Peronism. However, they split after the 1959 Cuban Revolution into three groups: the one most opposed to the Peronist alliance, led by Catholic priest Julio Meinvielle, retained the original hard-line stance; the New Argentina Movement (MNA), headed by Dardo Cabo, was founded on 9 June 1961, to commemorate General Valle's Peronist uprising on the same date in 1956, and became the precursor to all modern Catholic nationalist groups in Argentina; and the Revolutionary Nationalist Tacuara Movement (MNRT), formed by Joe Baxter and José Luis Nell, who joined Peronism believing in its capacity for revolution, and without forsaking nationalism, broke from the Church and abandoned anti-Semitism. Baxter's MNRT became progressively Marxist, and many of the Montoneros and of the ERP's leaders came from this group.

Following Onganía's replacement in June 1970, General Roberto M. Levingston proposed the replacement of Argentina's myriad political parties with "four or five" (vetted by the Revolución Argentina regime). This attempt to govern indefinitely against the will of the different political parties united Peronists and their opposition in a joint declaration of 11 November 1970, billed as la Hora del Pueblo (The Hour of the People), which called for free and immediate democratic elections to put an end to the political crisis. The declaration was signed by the Radical Civic Union (UCRP), the Justicialist Party (Peronist Party), the Argentine Socialist Party (PSA), the Democratic Progressive Party (PCP) and the Partido Bloquista (PB).

The opposition's call for elections led to Levingston's replacement by General Alejandro Lanusse, in March 1971. Faced with strong opposition and social conflicts, General Lanusse declared his intention to restore constitutional democracy by 1973, though without Peronist participation. Lanusse proposed the Gran Acuerdo Nacional (Great National Agreement) in July 1971, which was to find an honorable exit for the military junta without allowing Peronism to participate in the election. The proposal was rejected by Perón, who formed the FRECILINA alliance (Frente Cívico de Liberación Nacional, Civic Front of National Liberation), headed by his new delegate Héctor José Cámpora (a member of the Peronist Left). The alliance gathered his Justicialist Party and the Integration and Development Movement (MID), headed by Arturo Frondizi. FRECILINA pressed for free and unrestricted elections, which ultimately took place in March 1973.

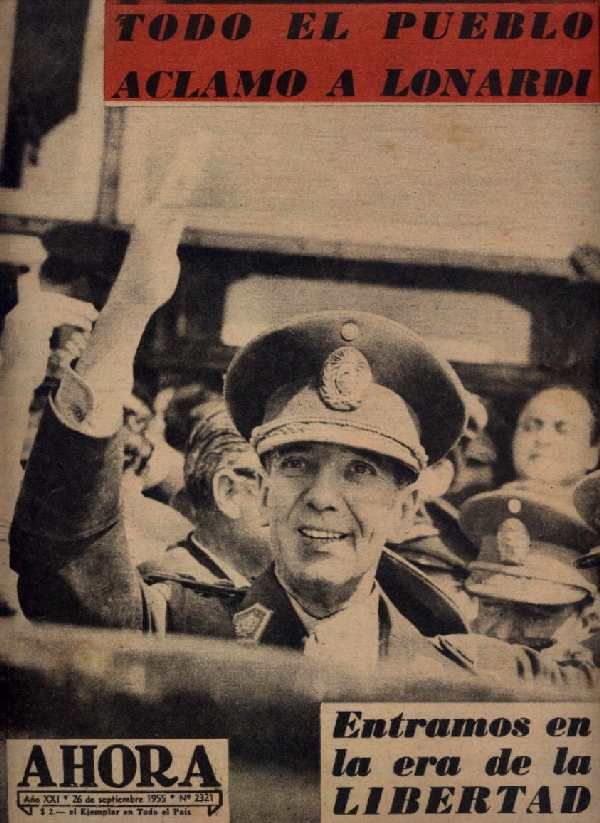
The new leader, General Eduardo Lonardi, waves in a 1955 newsmagazine cover. His gradualist approach to "de-Perónization" led to his prompt ousting.

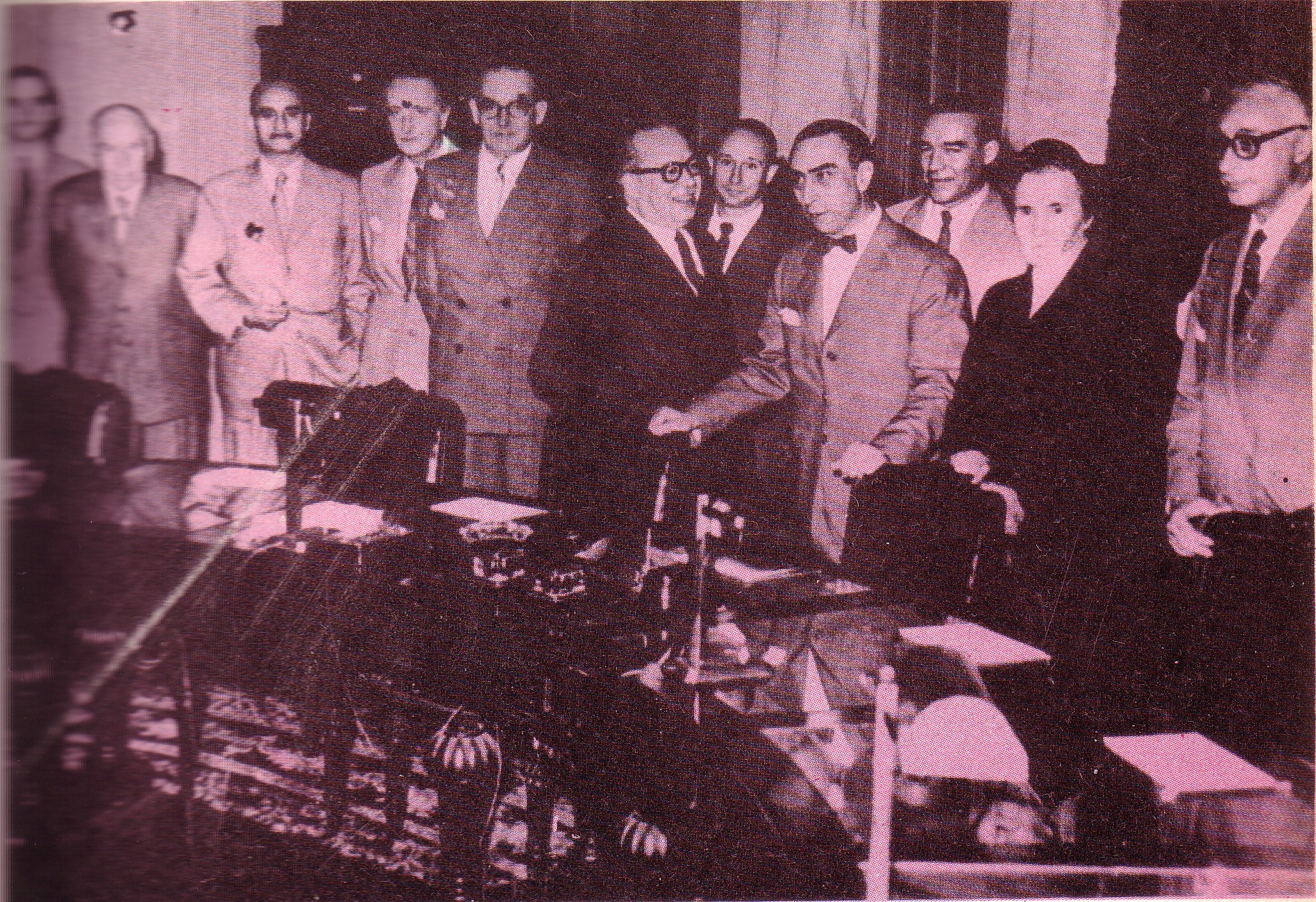
First meeting of the Junta's Civilian Advisory Board, 1955. Despite great pressure to the contrary, the board recommended that most of Perón's social reforms be kept in place.

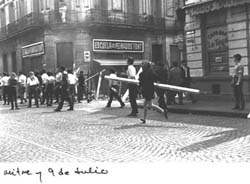
Student unrest in Rosario, 1969 (the Rosariazo). Unable to return on his volition, Perón began rallying besieged leftist students (the very people he had repressed in office).

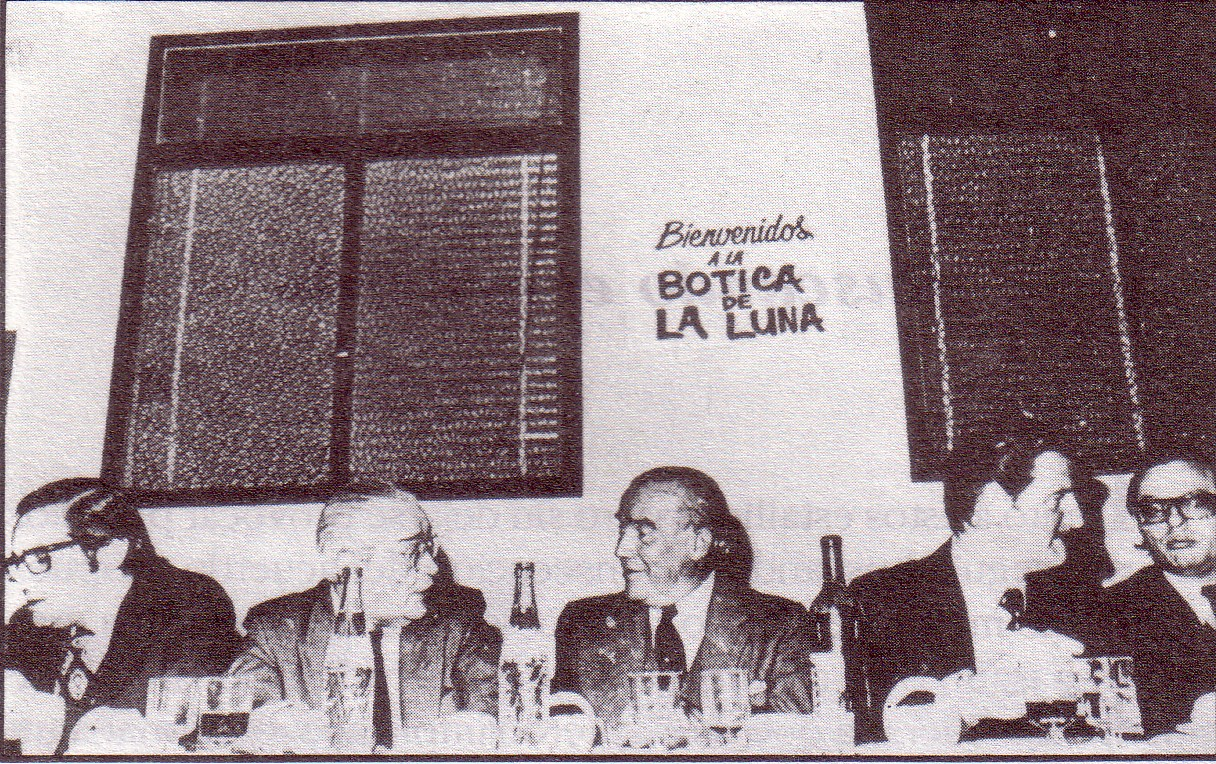
UCR leader Ricardo Balbín, Conservative Horacio Thedy and Perón's delegate, Daniel Paladino (middle three) find rare common cause after General Levingston's 1970 power grab. Their joint Hour of the People statement helped lead to elections in 1973 (and to Perón's return).

=== Relationship with Che Guevara ===
Che Guevara and Perón were sympathetic to each other. Pacho O'Donnell states that Che Guevara, as Cuban minister, attempted to arrange for the return of Perón to Argentina in the early 1960s and sent financial support for that end. However, Perón disapproved of Guevara's advocacy of guerrilla warfare as antiquated. In Madrid, Perón and Guevara met twice in 1966. These meetings, as the meetings Perón held with other leftists in Madrid (such as Salvador Allende), were arranged with great secrecy to avoid complaints or expulsion from Francoist Spain. According to Enrique Pavón Pereyra, who was present at the second meeting between Guevara and Perón in Madrid, Perón tried to discourage and warned Guevara of his guerrilla plans in Bolivia: "you will not survive in Bolivia. Suspend that plan. Search for alternatives. [...] Do not commit suicide."

Enrique Pavón Pereyra was only present for the first part of the meeting; he then served mate so that Perón and Guevara could drink together and left the meeting room to provide them with some privacy. Pavón Pereyra speculated about the conversation that followed in his absence: according to him, Perón would likely have explained to Guevara that he could not compromise support for his planned operations, but that "when" Guevara "moved activities" to Argentina he would provide Peronist support. After the encounter, Perón commented to a friend in a letter about meeting Guevara, calling him "an immature utopian – but one of us – I am happy for it to be so because he is giving the yankees a real headache."

Under the influence of John William Cooke who combined Marxism with Peronism, Perón praised the Cuban Revolution and discussed the parallels it had with his own 'revolution', and would increasingly adapt the Cuban rhetoric in the 1960s. After vising Perón in Madrid, Che Guevara argued that Peronism is "a kind of indigenous Latin American socialism with which the Cuban Revolution could side". Perón maintained a close relationship with Guevara and paid homage to him upon his death in October 1967, calling him "one of ours, perhaps the best" and remarking that Peronism "as a national, popular and revolutionary movement, pays homage to the idealist, the revolutionary, Comandante Ernesto 'Che' Guevara, Argentine guerrilla dead in action taking up arms to seek the triumph of national revolutions in Latin America."

== Third term (1973–1974) ==
General elections were held on 11 March 1973. Perón was banned from running, but a stand-in, Dr. Héctor Cámpora, a left-wing Peronist and his personal representative, won the election and took office on 25 May. On 20 June 1973, Perón returned from Spain to end his 18-year exile. According to Página 12 newspaper, Licio Gelli, master of Propaganda Due, had provided an Alitalia plane to return Perón to his native country. Gelli was part of a committee supporting Perón, along with Carlos Menem, who would also serve as president of Argentina. Former Italian premier Giulio Andreotti recalled an encounter between Perón and his wife Isabel with Gelli, saying that Perón knelt before Gelli to salute him.

On the day of Perón's return, a crowd of left-wing Peronists (estimated at 3.5 million according to police) gathered at the Ezeiza Airport in Buenos Aires to welcome him. Perón was accompanied by Cámpora, whose first measures were to grant amnesty to all political prisoners and re-establish relations with Cuba, helping Fidel Castro break the United States embargo against Cuba. This, along with his social policies, had earned him the opposition of right-wing Peronists, including the trade-unionist bureaucracy.

Camouflaged snipers opened fire on the crowd at the airport. The left-wing Peronist Youth Organization and the Montoneros had been trapped. At least 13 people were killed and 365 injured in this episode, which became known as the Ezeiza massacre.

Cámpora and Vice President Vicente Solano Lima resigned in July 1973, paving the way for new elections, this time with Perón's participation as the Justicialist Party nominee. Argentina faced mounting political instability, and Perón was viewed by many as the country's only hope for prosperity and safety. UCR leader Ricardo Balbín and Perón contemplated a Peronist-Radical joint government, but opposition in both parties made this impossible. Besides opposition among Peronists, Ricardo Balbín had to consider opposition within the UCR itself, led by Raúl Alfonsín, a leader among the UCR's center-left. Perón received 62% of the vote, returning him to the presidency. He began his third term on 12 October 1973, with Isabel, his wife, as vice president.

On Perón's advice, Cámpora had appointed José Ber Gelbard as policy adviser to the critical Economy Ministry. Inheriting an economy that had doubled in output since 1955 with little indebtedness and only modest new foreign investment, inflation had become a fixture in daily life and was worsening: consumer prices rose by 80% in the year to May 1973 (triple the long-term average, up to then). Making this a policy priority, Ber Gelbard crafted a "social pact" in hopes of finding a happy median between the needs of management and labour. Providing a framework for negotiating price controls, guidelines for collective bargaining and a package of subsidies and credits, the pact was promptly signed by the CGT (then the largest labour union in South America) and management (represented by Julio Broner and the CGE). The measure was largely successful, initially: inflation slowed to 12% and real wages rose by over 20% during the first year. GDP growth accelerated from 3% in 1972 to over 6% in 1974. The plan also envisaged the paydown of Argentina's growing public external debt, then around US$8 billion, within four years.

The improving economic situation encouraged Perón to pursue interventionist social and economic policies similar to those he had carried out in the Forties: nationalizing banks and various industries, subsidizing native businesses and consumers, regulating and taxing the agricultural sector, reviving the IAPI, placing restrictions on foreign investment, and funding a number of social welfare programs. In addition, new rights for workers were introduced.

James P. Brennan and Marcelo Rougier note that during Perón's third presidency, "virtually no aspect of the national economy was left out — industry, technology and science, tax policy — all were included, and the reforms were significant". Perón passed laws that suspended all eviction proceedings, facilitated credit to evicted workers and farmers, encouraged establishment of worker cooperatives, prohibited foreign investment unless technological improvement accompanied it, nationalized foreign markets in Argentina, established state supervision of the marketing of food products and raw resources, and taxed unproductive and underused land. Perón also nationalized the banking system, which had been the core demand of Gelbard.

The 1973 oil shock, however, forced Ber Gelbard to rethink the Central Bank's projected reserves and, accordingly, undid planned reductions in stubborn budget deficits, then around US$2 billion a year (4% of GDP). Increasingly frequent collective bargaining agreements in excess of Social Pact wage guidelines and a resurgence in inflation led to growing strain on the viability of the plan by mid-1974, however.

Nevertheless, Perón's Social Pact resulted in a general wage increase of 20%, followed by wage and price freeze that was to remain until June 1975. Conversely, Argentine private business recorded a 16% drop in profits on average. By the end of 1973, Argentina had a record surplus in foreign trade, which enhanced the redistributive policies of Perón. Inflation fell abruptly despite wage increases. However, the rise of fuel prices resulted in a renegotiation of the Social Pact in February 1974. Perón intervened in favor of trade unions - the new Social Pact for 1974 had Perón announce an increase of 13% in nominal wages, restoring purchasing power that workers lost in 1973, and increasing the workers' share of national income. This satistifed the Peronist trade unions - workers' incomes recovered by 5% on average, while Argentine corporations faced another drop in profits.

The Peronist economic plan also carried out ambitious reforms for regional development, with the goal of decentralizing industrial activities by promoting underdeveloped and frontier areas and curtailing the already developed ones. Perón banned the establishment of new enterprises in the federal capital of Argentina, Buenos Aires. At the same time, underdeveloped areas were designated as "promotion zones". The poor northwest provinces of San Luis, La Rioja and Catamarca were given additional developmental measures.

Brennan and Rougier remarked that compared to his first and second term, in the 1970s Perón adopted a "more populist agenda, one that this time had a faintly Marxist tinge to it." The government's stated objective of the Social Pact was to reduce the role of business in national income. While labelled "class collaboration", Perón's economic policy strongly favoured trade unions and greatly disadvantaged business. Reporting on the power that Perón's Social Pact gave to trade unions, an association of metalworking industry businesses in Córdoba, the Cámara de Industriales Metalúrgicos de Córdoba, wrote: "Unions' tactics have changed. There are no general strikes but rather demands for higher wages, disregarding all legal procedures, are made factory by factory. The methods adopted are personal intimidation and reducing the already low levels of productivity."

However, Perón's third term was also marked by an escalating conflict between the Peronist left- and right-wing factions. This turmoil was fueled primarily by calls for repression against the left on the part of leading CGT figures, a growing segment of the armed forces (particularly the navy) and right-wing radicals within his own party, notably Perón's most fascist adviser, José López Rega. López Rega, appointed Minister of Social Welfare, was in practice given power far beyond his purview, soon controlling up to 30 percent of the federal budget. Diverting increasing funds, he formed the Triple A, a death squad that soon began targeting not only the violent left; but moderate opposition, as well. The Montoneros became marginalized in the Peronist movement as they took an increasingly hostile attitude towards the Peronist bureaucratic trade unions, which formed the dominating faction. Explaining the conflict, historians Ronaldo Munck or Ricardo Falcón noted:

The radical Montoneros organisation provided little political leadership against the new rise of the trade union bureaucracy. In fact, left-wing Peronism had always maintained a somewhat moralistic view of the labour bureaucracy. Emphasis was placed on the leaders' individual corruption and their treacherous role, to the detriment of an understanding of their structural and political role in the labour movement. According to the militaristic logic of the Montoneros the answer to these traitors was 'execution'. Vandor had been killed in 1969, his rival José Alonso in 1970, now in 1973 it was the turn of CGT leader José Rucci, and a year later building workers' union leader Rogelio Coria.

The rift between Perón and the far left became irreconcilable following 25 September 1973, murder of José Ignacio Rucci, the moderately conservative Secretary General of CGT. Rucci was killed in a commando ambush in front of his residence. His murder was long attributed to the Montoneros (whose record of violence was well-established by then), but it is arguably Argentina's most prominent unsolved mystery. Perón was heartbroken by the assassination of trade union leader José Ignacio Rucci, for which the Montoneros claimed responsibility. Rucci's assassination marked the first time Perón cried in public. Perón went into state of depression, and declared at his death: "They killed my son. They cut off my legs". The death of Rucci made Perón cold towards Montoneros, culminating in Perón demanding their expulsion from the Justicalist Movement on May Day 1974, which insulted the Peronist Left. However, Perón did not desire to abandon the Montoneros, and he sought to restore his trust in his last speech from June 1974, where he denounced "the oligarchy and the pressures exerted by imperialism upon his government", suggesting that he was being manipulated by the Peronist right wing.

Another guerrilla group, the Guevarist ERP, also opposed the Peronist right-wing. They started engaging in armed struggle, assaulting an important Army barracks in Azul, Buenos Aires Province on 19 January, and creating a foco (insurrection) in Tucumán, a historically underdeveloped province in Argentina's largely rural northwest. In May 1973 the ERP claimed to have extorted $1 million in goods from the Ford Motor Company, after murdering one executive and wounding another. Five months after the payment, the guerrillas killed another Ford executive and his three bodyguards. Only after Ford threatened to close down their operation in Argentina altogether, did Perón agree to have his army protect the plant.

Perón's failing health complicated matters. He developed an enlarged prostate and heart disease, and by at least one account, he may have been senile by the time he was sworn in for his third term. His wife frequently had to take over as Acting President over the course of the next year.

Perón maintained a full schedule of policy meetings with both government officials and chief base of support, the CGT. He also presided over the inaugural of the Atucha I Nuclear Power Plant (Latin America's first) in April; the reactor, begun while he was in exile, was the fruition of work started in the 1950s by the National Atomic Energy Commission, his landmark bureau. His diminishing support from the far left (which believed Perón had come under the control of the right-wing entorno (entourage) led by López Rega, UOM head Lorenzo Miguel, and Perón's own wife) turned to open enmity following rallies on the Plaza de Mayo on 1 May and 12 June in which the president condemned their demands and increasingly violent activities.

Perón was reunited with another friend from the 1950s – Paraguayan dictator Alfredo Stroessner – on 16 June to sign the bilateral treaty that broke ground on Yacyretá Hydroelectric Dam (the world's second-largest). Perón returned to Buenos Aires with clear signs of pneumonia and, on 28 June, he had a series of heart attacks. Isabel was on a trade mission to Europe, but returned urgently and was secretly sworn in on an interim basis on 29 June. Following a promising day at the official presidential residence of Quinta de Olivos in the Buenos Aires suburb of Olivos, Juan Perón had a final attack on Monday, 1 July 1974 and died at 13:15. He was 78 years old.

Perón's corpse was first transported by hearse to Buenos Aires Metropolitan Cathedral for a funeral mass the next day. Afterwards the body, dressed in full military uniform, was taken to the Palace of the National Congress, where it lay in state over the next 46 hours, during which more than 130,000 people filed past the coffin. Finally, at 09:30 on a rainy Thursday, 4 July the funeral procession commenced. Perón's Argentine flag-covered casket was placed on a limber towed by a small army truck (escorted by cavalry and a large motorcade of motorcycles and a few armored vehicles) through the capital's streets back to Olivos. At least one million people turned out for Perón's funeral, some of whom threw flowers at the casket and chanted, "¡Perón! ¡Perón! ¡Perón!" as it passed by. Along the 16-kilometer (10-mile) route from the Palace to Olivos, hundreds of armed soldiers lining it were assigned to restrain the crowd. As many as 2,000 foreign journalists covered the ceremony. The funeral cortege reached its final destination two and a half hours later. There, the coffin was greeted by a 21-gun salute. Many international heads of state offered condolences to Argentina following the demise of President Perón. Three days of official mourning were declared thereafter. Perón had recommended that his wife, Isabel, rely on Balbín for support, and at the president's burial Balbín uttered an historic phrase: "The old adversary bids farewell to a friend." Paraguay declared eight days of mourning, Uruguay declared seven days of mourning, Brazil, Bolivia, Cuba and Spain declared three days of mourning.

Isabel Perón succeeded her husband to the presidency, but proved incapable of managing the country's political and economic problems, including the left-wing insurgency and the reactions of the extreme right. Ignoring her late husband's advice, Isabel gave Balbín no role in her new government, instead granting broad powers to López Rega, who started a "dirty war" against political opponents.

Isabel Perón's term ended abruptly on 24 March 1976 after a military coup d'état. A military junta, headed by General Jorge Videla, took control of the country, establishing the self-styled National Reorganization Process. The junta ramped up the "dirty war", combining widespread persecution of political dissidents with state terrorism. The death toll rose to thousands (at least 9,000, with human rights organizations claiming it was closer to 30,000). Many of these were "the disappeared" (desaparecidos), people kidnapped and executed without trial or record.

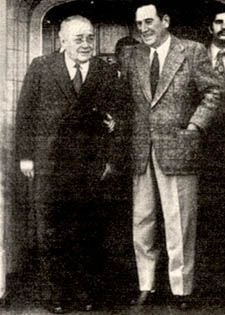
Perón hosts the head of the opposition UCR, Ricardo Balbín, at his home in preparations for the 1973 campaign.

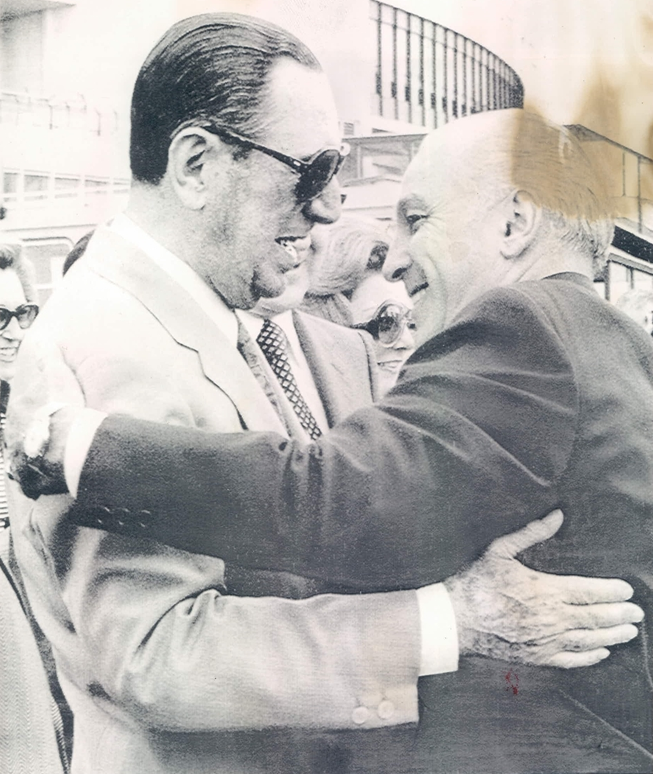
José López Rega, Perón's personal secretary, proved a detrimental influence over the aging leader, leveraging this for corruption and revenge.

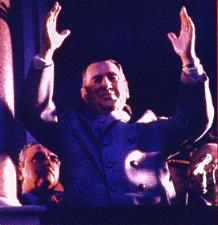
Perón greets supporters during a 12 June 1974 rally, his last.

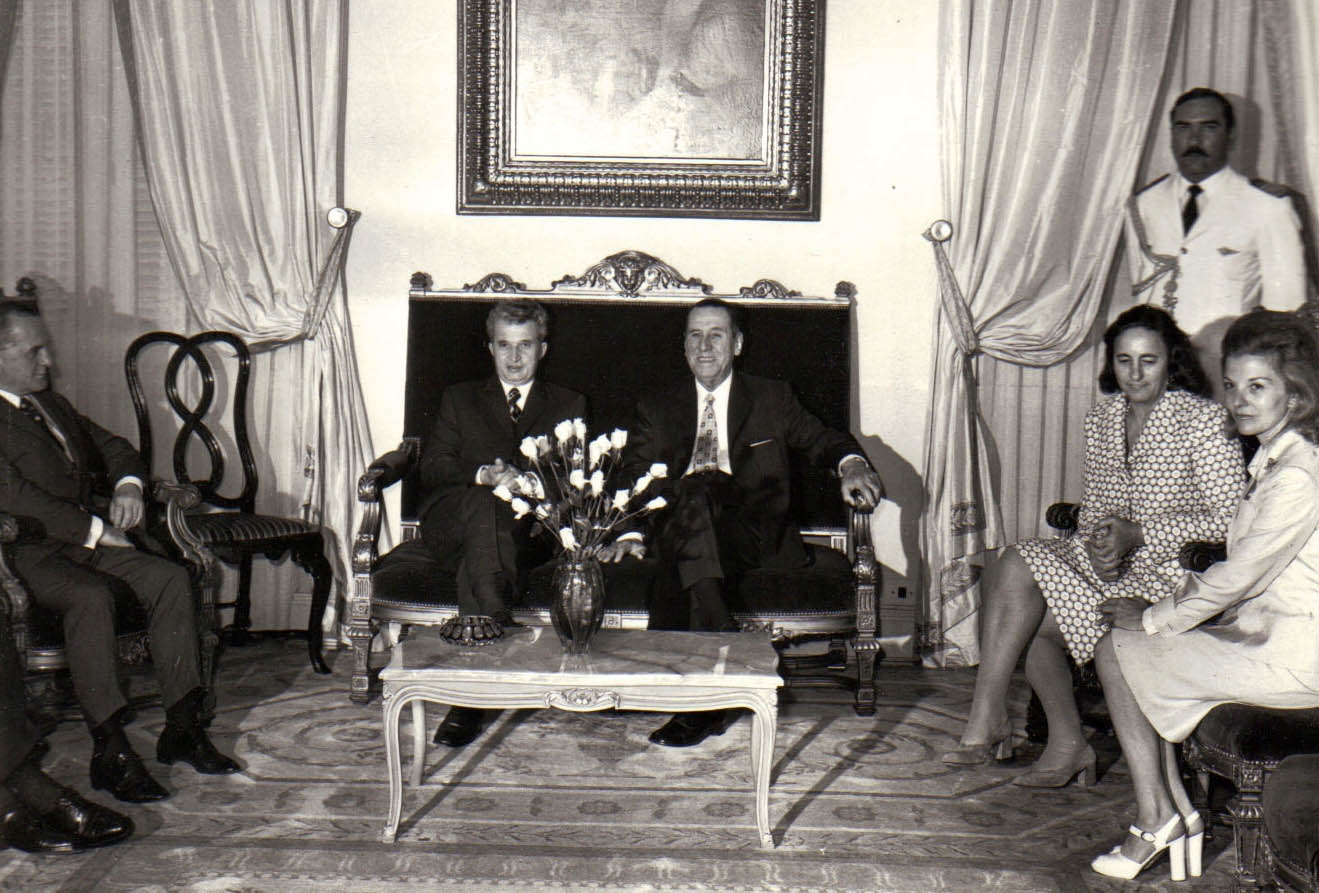
Juan and Isabel Perón with Nicolae and Elena Ceaușescu during their state visit to Argentina on 6 March 1974.

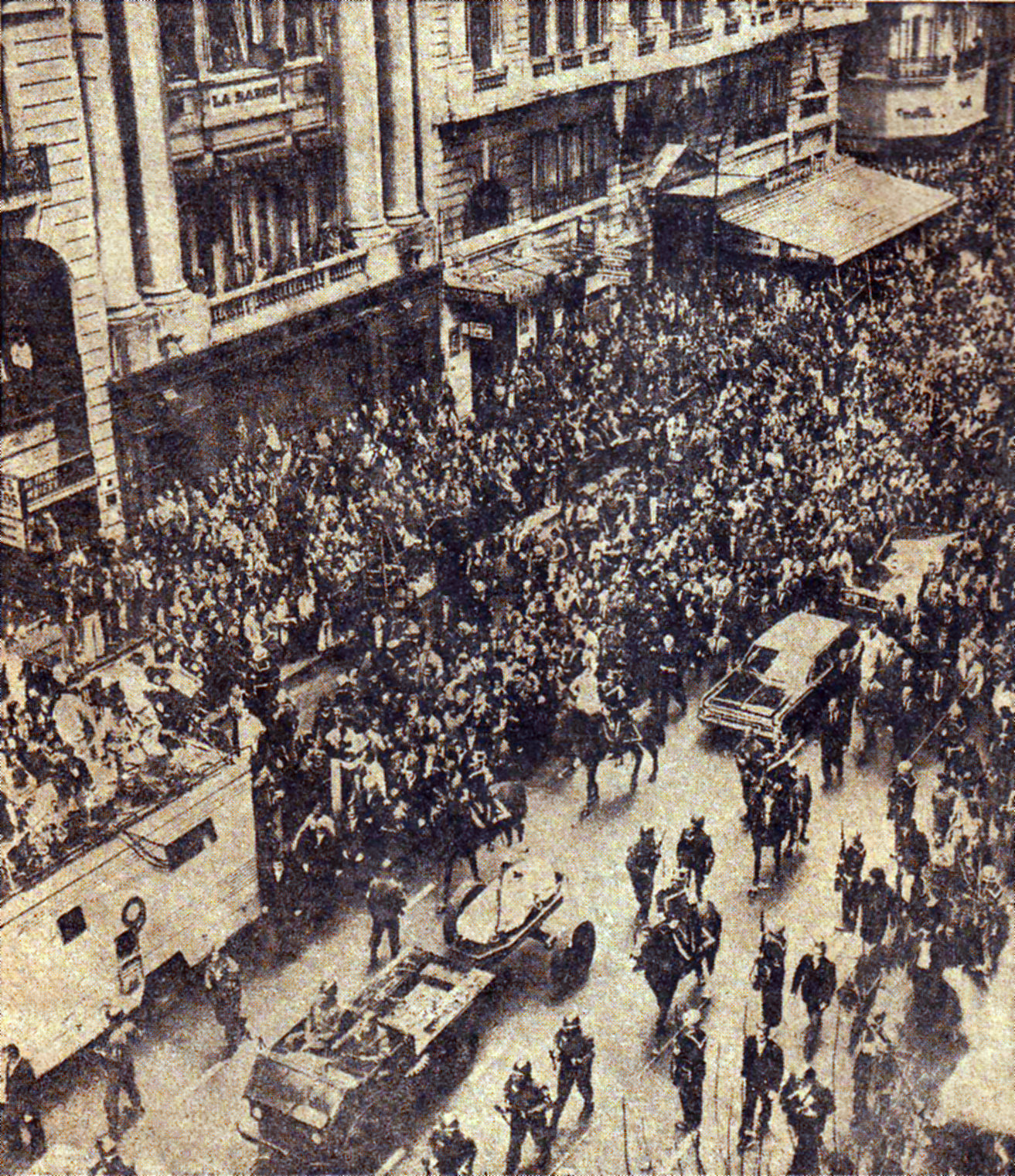
Perón's funeral cortège along the Avenida de Mayo.

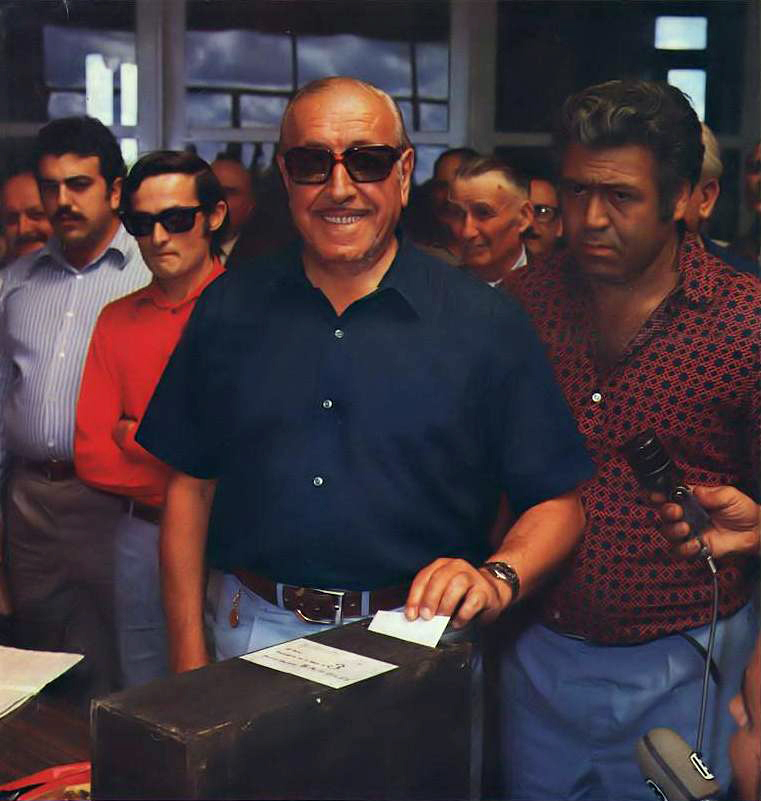
Perón's stand-in, Héctor Cámpora, votes in the 1973 elections. Perón nominated Cámpora to placate the Left, but their support for Perón waned after the leader made them guilty by association for the growing wave of violence.

=== Relationship with Allende and Pinochet ===
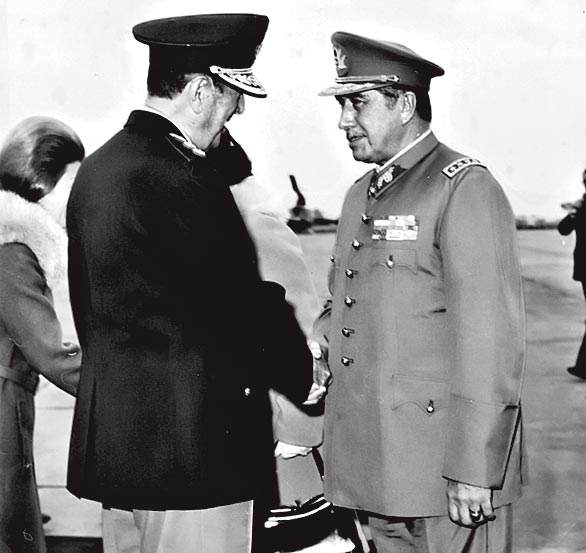
Perón greeting Augusto Pinochet at Morón Airbase on 14 May 1974.

Salvador Allende had actively rejected Perón's attempts of establishing cooperation between Chile and Argentina during the 1940s and 1950s. Allende received the election of Héctor Cámpora, who had previously lived in exile in Chile, as good news. Allende sent Aniceto Rodríguez to Buenos Aires to work on an alliance between the Socialist Party of Chile and the Justicialism. Later Allende attended the presidential inauguration of Campora. All of this was greeted favorably by Perón, who came to refer to Allende as "compañero". However, Perón also pointed to Allende as a cautionary example for the most radical of his followers. In September, just a few days before the 1973 Chilean coup d'etat, he addressed Tendencia Revolucionaria:

If you want to do as Allende, then look how it goes for Allende. One has to be calm.

— Juan Perón

Perón condemned the coup as a "fatality for the continent" stating that the coup leader Augusto Pinochet represented interests "well known" to him. He praised Allende for his "valiant attitude" of committing suicide. He took note of the role of the United States in instigating the coup by recalling his familiarity with coup-making processes.

On 14 May 1974 Perón received Pinochet at the Morón Airbase. Pinochet was heading to meet Alfredo Stroessner in Paraguay so the encounter at Argentina was technically a stopover. Pinochet and Perón were both reported to have felt uncomfortable during the meeting. Perón expressed his wishes to settle the Beagle conflict and Pinochet his concerns about Chilean exiles in Argentina near the frontier with Chile. Perón would have conceded on moving these exiles from the frontiers to eastern Argentina, but he warned "Perón takes his time, but accomplishes" (Perón tarda, pero cumple). Perón justified his meeting with Pinochet stating that it was important to keep good relations with Chile under all circumstances and with whoever might be in government.

== Mausoleum and legacy ==
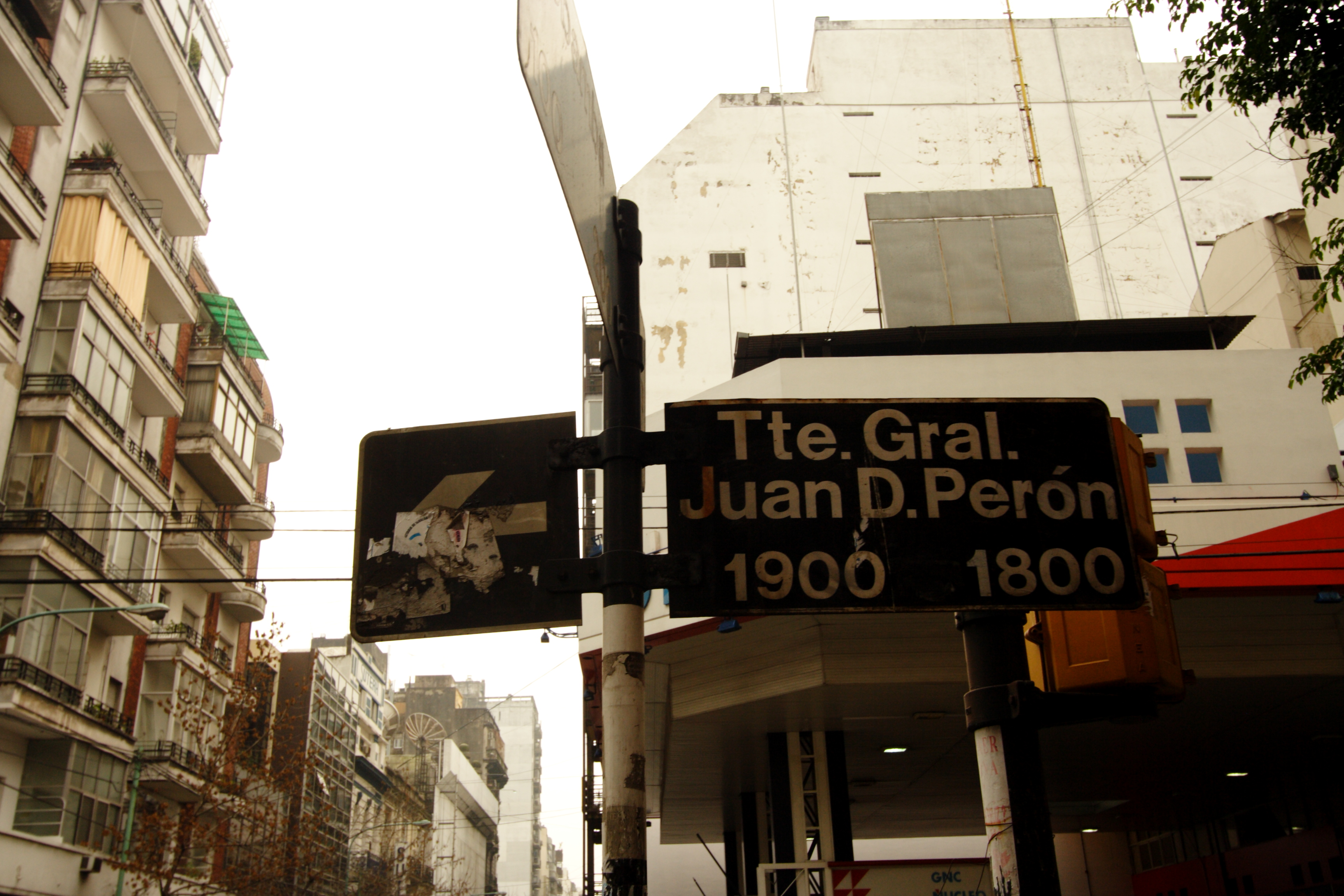
Perón Street in midtown Buenos Aires, one of numerous streets and avenues named in his honor when democracy returned to Argentina in 1983. It refers to him as General and not President.

Perón was buried in La Chacarita Cemetery in Buenos Aires. On 10 June 1987, his tomb was desecrated, and his hands and some personal effects, including his sword, were stolen. Perón's hands were cut off with a chainsaw. A ransom letter asking for US$8 million was sent to some Peronist members of Congress. This profanation was a ritualistic act to condemn Perón's spirit to eternal unrest, according to journalists David Cox and Damian Nabot in their book Second Death, who connected it to Licio Gelli and military officers involved during Argentina's Dirty War. The bizarre incident remains unresolved.

On 17 October 2006, his body was moved to a mausoleum at his former summer residence, rebuilt as a museum, in the Buenos Aires suburb of San Vicente. A few people were injured in incidents as Peronist trade unions fought over access to the ceremony, although police were able to contain the violence enough for the procession to complete its route to the mausoleum. The relocation of Perón's body offered his self-proclaimed illegitimate daughter, Martha Holgado, the opportunity to obtain a DNA sample from his corpse. She had attempted to have this DNA analysis performed for 15 years, and the test in November 2006 ultimately proved she was not his daughter. Holgado died of liver cancer on 7 June 2007. Before her death, she vowed to continue the legal battle to prove she was Perón's biological child.

Argentina joined the Non-Aligned Movement under Perón in 1973 and remained a member until the term of Carlos Menem in 1991.

== See also ==
- Peronism
- History of Argentina (1946-1955)

Political offices
New office	Secretary of Labour and Social Security; 1943–1945	Succeeded by Domingo Mercante
Preceded by Pedro Pablo Ramírez	Minister of War; 1944–1945	Succeeded by Eduardo Ávalos
Preceded by Edelmiro Farrell	Vice President of Argentina; 1944–1945	Succeeded by Juan Pistarini
Preceded by Edelmiro Farrell	President of Argentina; First and Second Terms; 1946–1955	Succeeded by Eduardo Lonardi
Preceded by Raúl Lastiri	President of Argentina; Third Term; 1973–1974	Succeeded by Isabel Perón
