= Paul Corner =

British historian of Fascist Italy

- Born: Paul Richard Corner; 1944 (age 81–82); Yorkshire, United Kingdom
- Citizenship: British
- Occupation: Historian
- Title: Emeritus professor of European history, University of Siena; Honorary president, Association for the Study of Modern Italy (2022–present)

Academic background
- Education: University of Cambridge; University of Oxford
- Thesis: Fascism in Ferrara (1971)
- Doctoral advisor: Christopher Seton-Watson

Academic work
- Discipline: History
- Sub-discipline: Modern Italian history; Italian fascism; Totalitarian regimes
- Institutions: University of Reading; University of Siena
- Main interests: Origins of Fascism in the Italian provinces; Rural society and small industry; The National Fascist Party and popular opinion; Public memory of Fascism
- Notable works: Fascism in Ferrara, 1915–1925 (1975); The Fascist Party and Popular Opinion in Mussolini's Italy (2012); Mussolini in Myth and Memory (2022)

Paul Richard Corner (born 1944 in Yorkshire) is a British historian of Fascist Italy.

Corner taught at the University of Reading and then at the University of Siena, where he is emeritus professor of European history. At Siena, he directed the Centre for the Study of Totalitarian Regimes. He studied the rise of Fascism in the Italian provinces, rural society and industrialisation, and the relationship between the National Fascist Party and popular opinion under Benito Mussolini. Corner was a founding member of the Association for the Study of Modern Italy (ASMI), and has been its honorary president since 2022.

His books include Fascism in Ferrara, 1915–1925 (1975), The Fascist Party and Popular Opinion in Mussolini's Italy (2012) and Mussolini in Myth and Memory (2022).

== Early life and education ==
Corner was born in Yorkshire in 1944. He was educated at the Northern Grammar School, Portsmouth, and took his first degree in history at St. John's College, Cambridge, in 1966. After a year teaching in a Chinese Middle school in Sibu, Borneo, he went, in 1967, to Balliol College, Oxford, to study for a D.Phil. under the supervision of historian Christopher Seton-Watson. He worked on his doctoral thesis until 1971, which was later revised and published as Fascism in Ferrara, 1915–1925. In 1971, he also held a grant from the Fondazione Luigi Einaudi in Turin to complete his research on Fascism in Ferrara.

== Career ==
Between 1970 and 1971 he was a researcher at the Fondazione Luigi Einaudi in Turin, and from 1971 to 1972 he held a Junior Research Fellowship at St. Antony's College, Oxford.

In 1974, he was appointed Reader in Italian History in the Department of Italian Studies at the University of Reading, becoming, at the same time, Director of the Centre for the Advanced Study of Italian Society. Stuart Woolf had also held the post, and Christopher Duggan was appointed to it in 1987. He left Reading in 1987 to take up the Chair of Contemporary Italian History at the University of Siena. In 1992 the chair was renamed Contemporary European History. While at Siena he had responsibility for the international Masters programme (Euromasters) and for a number of Erasmus agreements.

In 2005, he founded the Centre for the Study of Totalitarian Regimes (which he later directed as well) and developed links with European, American, and Asian universities with similar interests. Of particular importance for the following decade were the links established with Sogang University, Seoul. His continuing collaboration with Jie-Hyun Lim produced in 2016 the co-edited volume The Palgrave Handbook of Mass Dictatorship. As of 2026, he is emeritus professor of European history at Siena.

With Martin Rose of the British Council, Corner founded, in 1993, the Pontignano Conference, which brings together every year British and Italian politicians, academics, journalists, and businessmen. https://www.corrieredellospettacolo.net/2018/01/23/history-and-democracy-2-from-the-racial-laws-to-the-new-fascists/

Corner was a founding member of the Association for the Study of Modern Italy (ASMI). The association was created after a meeting of British historians and political scientists working on contemporary Italy, which Seton-Watson convened at Oriel College in 1982. Corner has been ASMI's honorary president since 2022, and in 2011 he introduced a special issue of the association's journal, Modern Italy, dedicated to Seton-Watson's memory.

== Research and work ==
=== Origins of Fascism and rural society ===
Corner's study of Fascism in Ferrara appeared first in Italian, as Il fascismo a Ferrara, 1915–1925, translated by Giovanni Ferrara and published by Laterza in 1974. Oxford University Press then published the English edition in its Oxford Historical Monographs series in 1975.

In his article "The Road to Fascism: An Italian Sonderweg?" (2002), Corner identified many of the underlying factors that produced Fascism in the years 1900–1915 and in the failure of Giovanni Giolitti's reformist strategy, rather than in the divisions of the war or the conflicts of 1919–1920. The rise of the movement and its expansion in the late 1920, he argued, was less due to the looming threat of a working-class revolution but rather due to long-standing structural problems in parts of rural Italy, above all on the large estates of the Po Valley. Contemporary European History printed the article with a critical comment by Alexander De Grand and a response by Corner. De Grand doubted that the Giolittian period amounted to a Sonderweg and compared it with France after the Dreyfus affair.

Corner also wrote on rural society and the growth of small industry in Contadini e industrializzazione (1993) and, with Anna Cento Bull, in From Peasant to Entrepreneur: The Survival of the Family Economy in Italy (1993).

=== Dictatorship and popular opinion ===
In 2002, Corner published "Italian Fascism: Whatever Happened to Dictatorship?" in The Journal of Modern History. He later presented its argument as "the central feature of Fascism was dictatorship, which means rule by force". Corner edited Popular Opinion in Totalitarian Regimes: Fascism, Nazism, Communism (2009), which includes his chapter on popular opinion in the Italian provinces during the 1930s.

The Fascist Party and Popular Opinion in Mussolini's Italy (2012) is in two parts. The first covers the workings of the National Fascist Party (PNF) in the provinces, and the second the relations between the party and the population in the 1930s. Corner drew on state and party archives, especially reports on public opinion compiled by police informers. He argued that Mussolini and successive party secretaries never brought the provincial bosses under central control. Factional feuding and disputes with prefects and police chiefs, he argued, discredited the regime. By the end of the 1930s, on his account, popular identification with the regime had collapsed. The party's failure therefore came before the military defeats of the Second World War. He put the conclusion in the phrase "Italy proved stronger than Fascism". Corner and Duggan, whose Fascist Voices appeared the same year, gave a number of joint presentations of their books, including one at the British Academy.

He went on to edit Il fascismo in provincia (2014) with Valeria Galimi. In 2022 he edited 1940. Il fascismo sceglie la guerra, on Italy's entry into the Second World War, and contributed a chapter on Italian popular opinion in 1940.

=== Memory of Fascism ===
Mussolini in Myth and Memory: The First Totalitarian Dictator was published by Oxford University Press in 2022. Viella published an Italian translation by Teresa Bertilotti the same year, as Mussolini e il fascismo. Storia, memoria e amnesia. The book separates history, which rests on documents and archives, from memory. It sets popular claims about the regime against the historical evidence: that Fascism was essentially benign, that it enjoyed mass consensus, and that Mussolini restored order, served as a statesman and modernised the country. Corner described Fascist violence as "systematic and aggressive" and "central to fascist ideology". He asked why, if there had been mass consensus, the regime needed the political police, the OVRA and the Special Tribunal for the Defence of the State. He attributed the persistence of a favourable memory of the regime partly to what he called Italians' "persistent recourse to victimhood".

In a chapter in Rethinking Fascism: The Italian and German Dictatorships (2022), edited by Andrea Di Michele and Filippo Focardi, Corner argued that the marginal place of Italian Fascism in international scholarship had encouraged a view of the regime as a lesser evil. He also argued that it had supported a self-absolving Italian memory built on the figure of the "good Italian". He proposed going "beyond consensus" to study coercion and social control, along with collaboration, conformism and complicity.

=== Critical reception of his work ===
Corner's first book, Fascism in Ferrara, 1915–1925, is now considered the classic study of the provincial origins of fascism. John Stuart MacDonald wrote in The Journal of Peasant Studies that it was "a gem". Charles F. Delzell, in The American Historical Review, called it an "excellent book" and hoped that it would inspire English-language studies of other provinces, and Charles Keserich described it as "a prudent and well-written contribution" to the study of Italian fascism.

In his review of The Fascist Party and Popular Opinion in Mussolini's Italy, R. J. B. Bosworth presented it as a corrective to culturally oriented interpretations of the regime and wrote that it "must become the basis of all future reading on this dictatorship". Anthony L. Cardoza called it "a compelling revision" of Renzo De Felice's view that Fascism had enjoyed a broad national consensus in the 1930s. Christopher Duggan described the first part as "the most detailed examination to date of the internal dynamics of the Fascist Party". He also questioned the reliance on informers' reports and the limited space given to the cult of Mussolini. Philip Morgan suggested, however, that the party's provincial failure "might well be over-drawn" and that "the battle has been engaged rather than won". Joshua Arthurs found it "an important and convincing contribution", though "sometimes a dense and repetitive read". In the London Review of Books, Richard J. Evans set Corner's account of the party's growing unpopularity against Duggan's use of letters and diaries.

Emilio Gentile and Patrick Bernhard were more critical. In a forum in the Journal of Modern Italian Studies, Gentile argued that Corner's thesis on the party's failure was "in full agreement" with De Felice's, and that the book added little to earlier research on the party and public opinion. He also held that the regime had founded its power on force and compulsory regimentation rather than on mass consent. In his response, Corner accepted that the regime's power rested on force, but proposed studying "the uses of an apparent consensus". Patrick Bernhard reviewed five recent books on Fascist Italy in Contemporary European History and called Corner's "the most conventional" of them. He described its method as "a classic top-down approach", relying almost exclusively on official documents, and disputed its comparison between the Fascist and Nazi parties. In 2015 the journal published a roundtable of responses, including a reading of the book by Lucy Riall that differed from Bernhard's and another reply by Corner.

In his most recent book, Mussolini in Myth and Memory, Corner responds to the increasing rehabilitation of Mussolini in Italy and attacks the nostalgic indulgence with which Italian fascism is now often viewed. He responds to the claim that 'Mussolini did many good things' by demonstrating the extent to which the current image of Italian fascism has been built around the falsities of fascist propaganda, still believed today. The publication of the book in 2022 coincided with the election in Italy of Giorgia Meloni, the post-fascist leader of Brothers of Italy, to the position of Prime Minister and attracted attention on that count. Timothy Garton Ash judged it 'timely', William Wall called it "a polemic against nostalgia for the fascist period", Tobias Jones described it as "a vital contribution to our understanding of modern Italian culture", and the Financial Times selected it as one of the best history books of 2022.

== Selected publications ==
=== Books ===
- Il fascismo a Ferrara, 1915–1925. Translated by Giovanni Ferrara. Rome and Bari: Laterza, 1974.
- Fascism in Ferrara, 1915–1925. Oxford Historical Monographs. London: Oxford University Press, 1975. ISBN 0198218575.
- With Anna Cento Bull. From Peasant to Entrepreneur: The Survival of the Family Economy in Italy. Oxford: Berg, 1993. ISBN 085496309X.
- Contadini e industrializzazione: Società rurale e impresa in Italia dal 1840 al 1940. Rome and Bari: Laterza, 1993. ISBN 8842042730.
- Riformismo e fascismo: L'Italia fra il 1900 e il 1940. Rome: Bulzoni, 2002. ISBN 8883196988.
- The Fascist Party and Popular Opinion in Mussolini's Italy. Oxford: Oxford University Press, 2012. ISBN 9780198730699.
- Italia fascista: Politica e opinione popolare sotto la dittatura. Rome: Carocci, 2015. ISBN 9788843076567.
- La dittatura fascista: Consenso e controllo durante il Ventennio. Rome: Carocci, 2017. ISBN 9788843082827.
- Mussolini in Myth and Memory: The First Totalitarian Dictator. Oxford: Oxford University Press, 2022. ISBN 9780192866646.
  - Italian edition: Mussolini e il fascismo: Storia, memoria e amnesia. Translated by Teresa Bertilotti. Rome: Viella, 2022. ISBN 9788833139890.

=== Edited volumes ===
- Popular Opinion in Totalitarian Regimes: Fascism, Nazism, Communism. Oxford: Oxford University Press, 2009. ISBN 9780199566525.
- With Valeria Galimi. Il fascismo in provincia: Articolazioni e gestione del potere tra centro e periferia. Rome: Viella, 2014. ISBN 9788867282067.
- With Jie-Hyun Lim. The Palgrave Handbook of Mass Dictatorship. London: Palgrave Macmillan, 2016. ISBN 9781137437624.
- 1940. Il fascismo sceglie la guerra. Rome: Viella, 2022. ISBN 9791254691960.

=== Articles ===
- "Italian Fascism: Whatever Happened to Dictatorship?" The Journal of Modern History 74, no. 2 (2002): 325–351. doi:10.1086/343410.
- "The Road to Fascism: An Italian Sonderweg?" Contemporary European History 11, no. 2 (2002): 273–295. doi:10.1017/S0960777302002059.
- "Dictatorship Revisited: Consensus, Coercion, and Strategies of Survival." Modern Italy 22, no. 4 (2017): 435–444. doi:10.1017/mit.2017.39.
