= Asmi =

ASMI may refer to:

- ASM International, a world leading Dutch company in the semiconductor industry
- ASM International (society), American Society for Metals
- American Sports Medicine Institute
- Association for the Study of Modern Italy
- Advanced System Management Interface, found in some IBM POWER microprocessors based IBM servers
- Asmi Shrestha (born 1993), Nepalese model
- ASMI, 9mm Machine Pistol developed by India.
