= James William Hunter =

James William Hunter of Thurston Manor FRSE (May 1783 – 3 December 1844) was a Scottish landowner, inventor and agricultural improver. His main claim to fame is the improvement to the mechanical odometer in 1827, creating a single-handed and single-wheeled device, setting a series of three 100-tooth cogs against 101-tooth cogs, attached to a wheel of circumference either 6 or 10 feet. This created a very convenient apparatus for land measurement, and is still the basis for modern day mechanical surveying odometers. The larger version was attached to the rear of a carriage and was the first known instrument calculating total vehicle distance travelled in a precise and visually clear way.

== Life ==
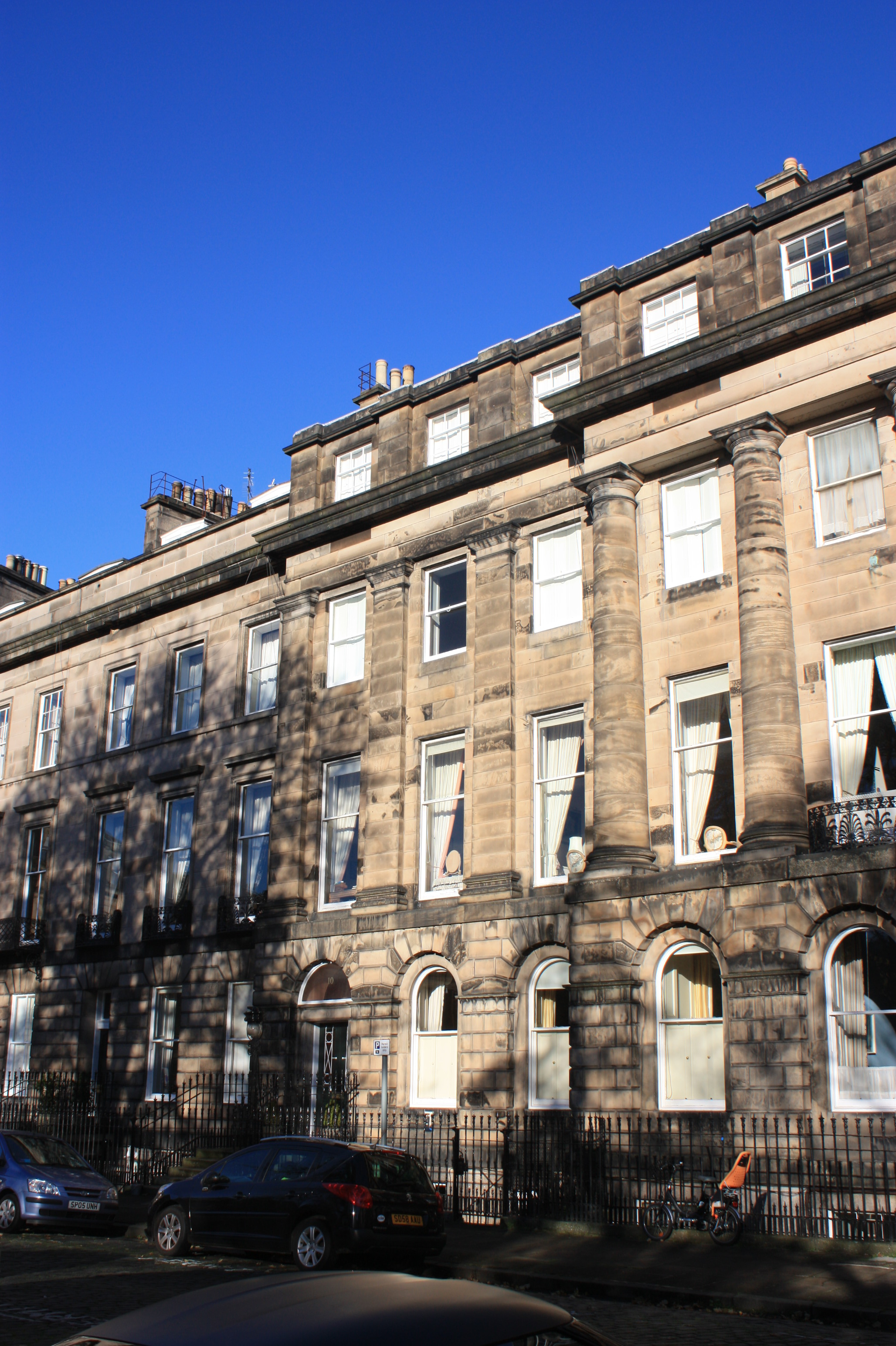
Hunter's Edinburgh townhouse at 10 Moray Place

He was born at Thurston Manor near Innerwick in East Lothian in 1783, the son of Robert Hunter of Thurston Manor (d.1810) and his wife Isabella Ord. The family was related to the Hunters of Hunterston.

From around 1798 he served in India then returned to Scotland to run the family estates following the death of his father.

In 1820 he was elected a Fellow of the Royal Society of Edinburgh. His proposers were Thomas Charles Hope, Sir David Brewster and Basil Hall.

In 1839 he appeared in the trial of Alexander Humphreys in his false claim to be Earl of Stirling. At this time he is listed under the address of his Edinburgh townhouse: 10 Moray Place.

He died in Leamington (where the family held a second estate) on 3 December 1844. He is buried in Innerwick in East Lothian with his family. His will is held in the National Archive at Kew.

== Family ==
He was married to Elizabeth Jennings. They had seven children: four boys and three girls.

- James William Hunter of Thurston Manor (1812-1879)(s.p.)
- Robert Francis Hunter (1815-1855) Major of 71st Highland Light Infantry regiment. Killed at Kertch in the Crimean War.
- Richard (1816-1885) Colonel in the Honorable East India Company's 7th Madras Cavalry. (Succeeded his brother at Thurston.)
- John Alexander Hunter (1820-1848).
- Isabella Hunter (b.1813)
- Sarah Elizabeth (b.1819).
- Margaret Eleanor (b.1824)

Their daughter Sarah Elizabeth is said to have married George Seton of Careston FRSE.

He was distant cousin to Very Rev Andrew Hunter FRSE.
