= Robert Seton-Watson =

British political activist and historian (1879–1951)

Robert William Seton-Watson FBA FRHistS
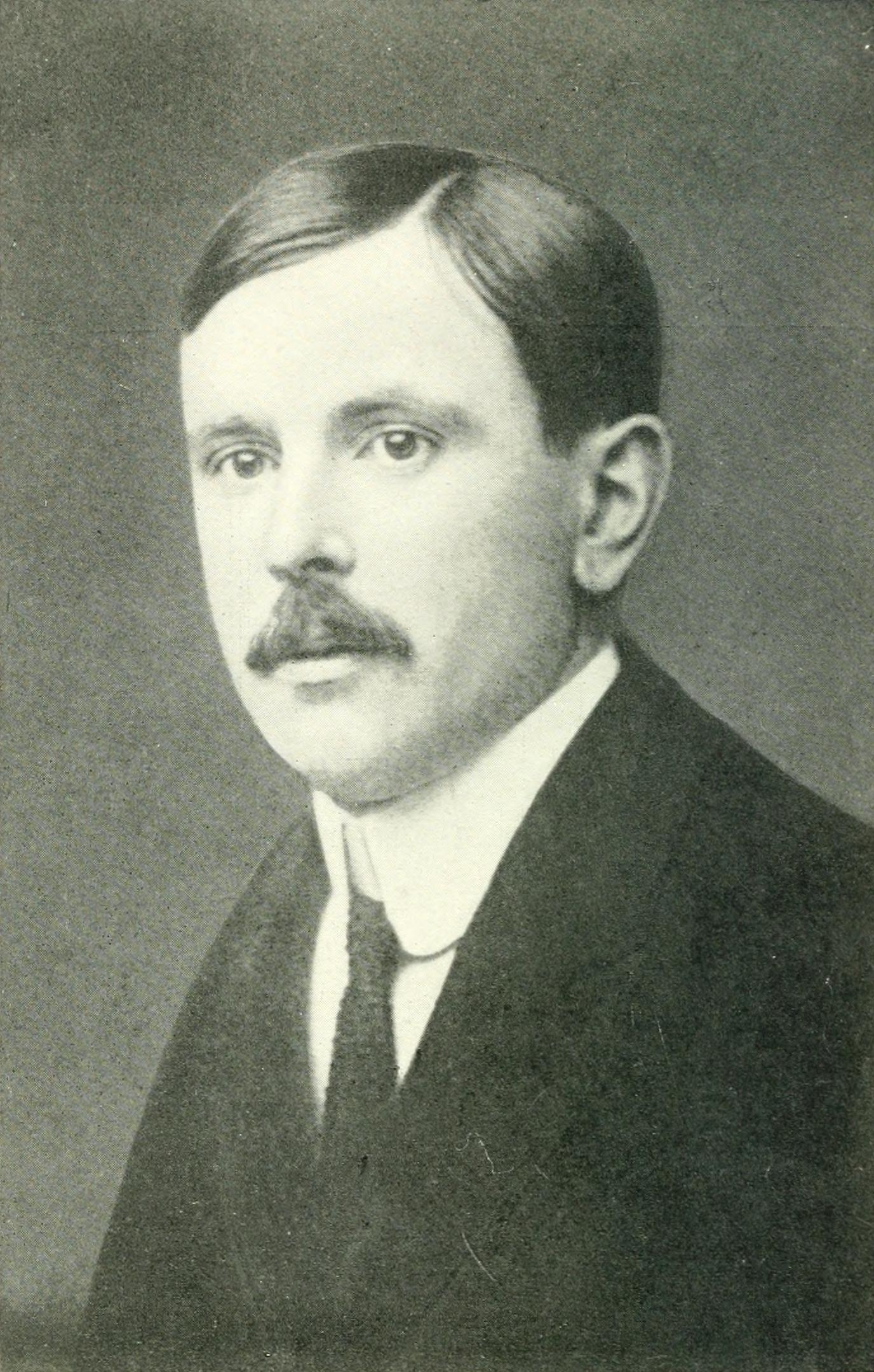
- Born: 20 August 1879; London, England
- Died: 25 July 1951 (aged 71); Skye, Scotland
- Education: New College, Oxford
- Occupation: Historian
- Years active: 1901–1949
- Known for: Political activist
- Title: President, Royal Historical Society
- Term: 1946–1949
- Children: Hugh Seton-Watson; Christopher Seton-Watson; Mary Seton-Watson
- Parent(s): William Livingstone Watson; Elizabeth Lindsay Seton

Robert William Seton-Watson FBA FRHistS (20 August 1879, in London – 25 July 1951, in Skye), commonly referred to as R. W. Seton-Watson and also known by the pseudonym Scotus Viator, was a British political activist and historian who played an active role in encouraging the breakup of Austria-Hungary and the emergence of Czechoslovakia and Yugoslavia during and after the First World War.

He was the father of two eminent historians, Hugh, who specialised in 19th-century Russian history, and Christopher, who worked on 19th-century Italy.

== Early life ==
Seton-Watson was born in London to Scottish parents. His father, William Livingstone Watson, had been a tea-merchant in Calcutta, and his mother, Elizabeth Lindsay Seton, was the daughter of George Seton, a genealogist and historian and the son of George Seton of the East India Company.

He was educated at Winchester College and New College, Oxford, where he read modern history under the historian and politician Herbert Fisher. He graduated with a first-class degree in 1901.

== In Austria-Hungary ==
After graduation, Seton-Watson travelled to Berlin University, the Sorbonne and Vienna University from where he wrote a number of articles on Hungary for The Spectator. His research for these articles took him to Hungary in 1906, and his discoveries there turned his sympathies against Hungary and in favour of the subjected Slovaks, Romanians and Southern Slavs. He learned Hungarian, Serbian and Czech, and in 1908 published his first major work, Racial Problems in Hungary.

Seton-Watson became friends with the Vienna correspondent of The Times, Henry Wickham Steed, and the Czechoslovak philosopher and politician Tomáš Masaryk. He argued in books and articles for a federal solution to the problems of Austria-Hungary, then driven by the tensions between its ancient dynastic model and the forces of ethnic nationalism.

== First World War and aftermath ==
After the outbreak of the First World War, Seton-Watson took practical steps to support the causes that he had formerly supported merely in print. He served as honorary secretary of the Serbian Relief Fund from 1914 and supported and found employment for his friend Masaryk after the latter fled to England to escape arrest. Both founded and published The New Europe (1916), a weekly periodical to promote the cause of the Czechs and other subject peoples. Seton-Watson financed this periodical himself.

Seton-Watson's private political activity was not appreciated in all quarters, and his critics within the British government finally succeeded in temporarily silencing him in 1917 by drafting him into the Royal Army Medical Corps, where he was given the job of scrubbing hospital floors. Others, however, rescued him, and from 1917 to 1918, he served on the Intelligence Bureau of the War Cabinet in the Enemy Propaganda Department, where he was responsible for British propaganda to the peoples of Austria-Hungary. He assisted in the preparations for the Rome Congress of subject Habsburg peoples, held in April 1918.

After the end of the war, Seton-Watson attended the Paris Peace Conference, 1919 in a private capacity and advised the representatives there of formerly subject peoples. Although on bad terms with the governments of the major powers, which he famously referred to as "the pygmies of Paris", he contributed to discussions of what the new frontiers of Europe should be, and he was especially influential in setting the postwar frontiers between Italy and the new state of Yugoslavia.

Although the British government was unenthusiastic about Seton-Watson, other governments were not and showed their gratitude after the conference. Masaryk became the first president of the new state of Czechoslovakia and welcomed him there. His friendship with Edvard Beneš, now Czechoslovakia's foreign minister, was consolidated. Seton-Watson was made an honorary citizen of Cluj in Transylvania, which had been incorporated into Romania despite the claims of Hungary and in 1920 was formally acclaimed by the Romanian Parliament. Yugoslavia rewarded him with an honorary degree from the University of Zagreb.

== Between the wars ==
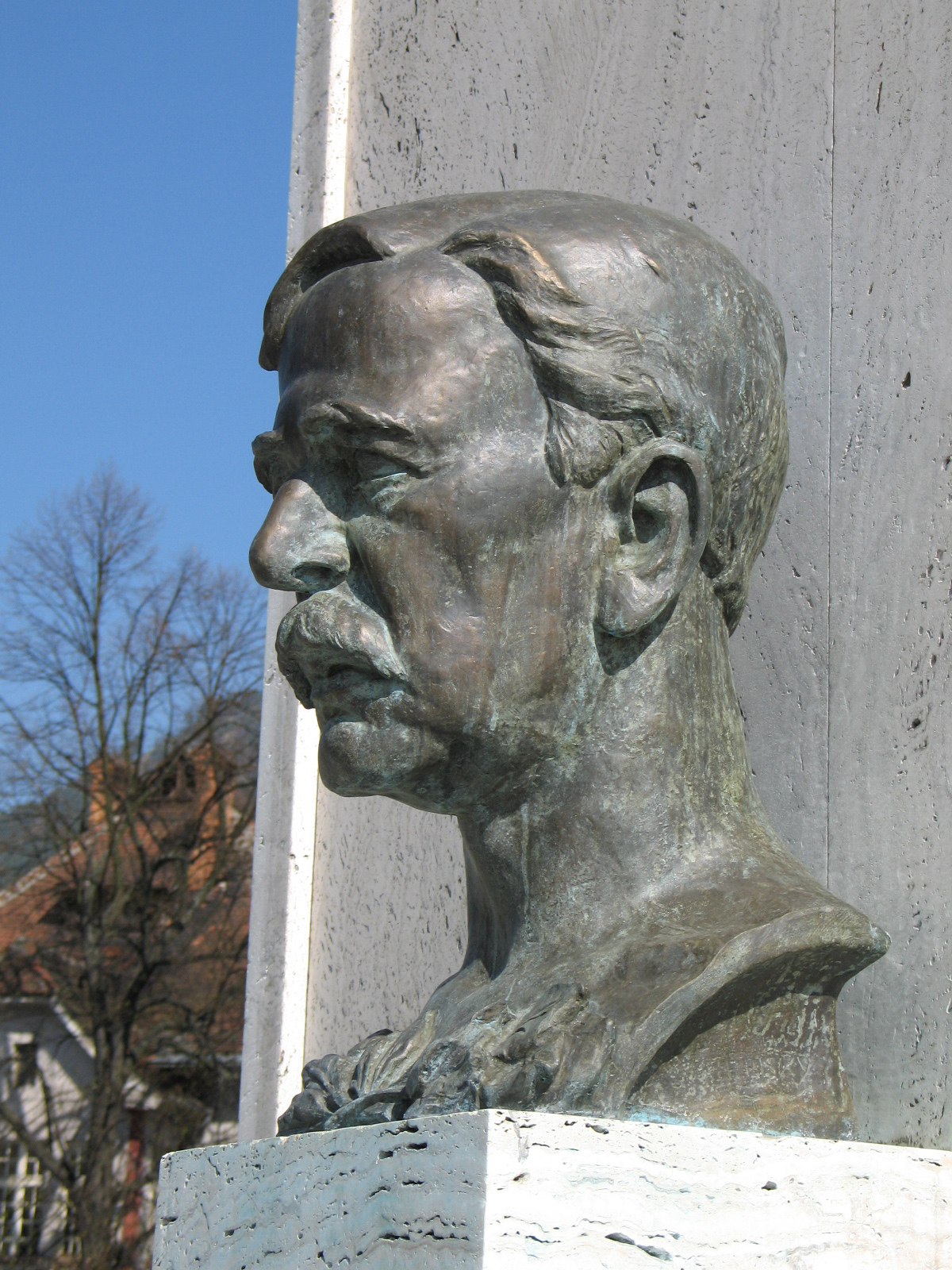
Bust of Robert William Seton-Watson by Vojtech Ihriský.

Seton-Watson had played a prominent role in establishing a School of Slavonic Studies (later the School of Slavonic and East European Studies, now a faculty of University College London) in 1915, partly to provide employment for his then-exiled friend Masaryk, and in 1922, he was appointed there as the first holder of the Masaryk chair in Central European history, a post that he held until 1945. He concentrated on his academic duties especially after 1931, when stock market losses removed much of his personal fortune, and he was appreciated by his students despite being somewhat impractical: according to Steed, he was "unpunctual, untidy, and too preoccupied with other matters. Pupils were advised not to hand over their work to him, for it would probably be mislaid".

During this time, he founded and edited The Slavonic Review with Sir Bernard Pares, to which Masaryk contributed the first article entitled ‘The Slavs After the War’.

== Second World War ==
As a long-established partisan of Czechoslovakia, Seton-Watson was naturally a firm opponent of Prime Minister Neville Chamberlain's policy of appeasement. In Britain and the Dictators: A Survey of Post-War British Policy (1938), he made one of the most devastating attacks on this policy. After Chamberlain's resignation, Seton-Watson held posts in the Foreign Research and Press Service (1939–1940) and Political Intelligence Bureau of the Foreign Office (1940–1942).

However, he had little influence on policy, partly because he did not have the access to decision makers that he had during the First World War and partly because he was not allowed to publish his writings.

== Later career ==
In 1945, Seton-Watson was appointed to the new chair of Czechoslovak Studies at Oxford University. He was president of the Royal Historical Society from 1946 to 1949.

In 1949, saddened by the new Soviet control of countries to whose independence he had devoted much of his life and by the death of his friend Edvard Beneš, Czechoslovakia's last noncommunist leader before the end of the Cold War, Seton-Watson retired to Kyle House on the Isle of Skye, where he died in 1951.

== Bibliography ==
Many of his books are online.

- Maximilian I. Holy Roman Emperor. (Stanhope Historical Essay 1911) (1902)
- Racial Problems in Hungary (London: Constable, 1908) online
- Corruption and Reform in Hungary: A Study of Electoral Practice (1911)
- The Southern Slav Question and the Habsburg Monarchy (London: Constable, 1911) online
- The War and Democracy (London: MacMillan and Co., 1914) online online
- Roumania and the Great War (1915) online
- The Rise of Nationality in the Balkans. London: Constable and Company Limited. 1917 – via Internet Archive.
- Europe in the Melting-Pot. London: Macmillan and Co., Limited. 1919 – via Internet Archive.
- The New Slovakia (1924)
- Sarajevo: A Study in the Origin of the Great War (1926)
- The Role of Bosnia in International Politics 1875–1919 (1932)
- A History of the Roumanians (1934)
- Disraeli, Gladstone and the Eastern Question (1935)
- Britain in Europe (1789–1914): A Survey of Foreign Policy (1937) online
- Britain and the Dictators: A Survey Of Post-War British Policy (1938)
- From Munich to Danzig (1939) online
- TGM and his Legacy to the English People (jointly with Josef Josten, 1942)
- Masaryk In England (1943)
- A History of the Czechs And Slovaks (1943)

== Notes ==
Academic offices
Preceded by Frank Stenton	President of the Royal Historical Society; 1946–1949	Succeeded by Theodore Plucknett
