= Association for the Study of Modern Italy =

Professional historical society in the United Kingdom

- Founded: 1982
- Founder: Christopher Seton-Watson
- Type: Non-profit
- Location: United Kingdom,
- Website: asmi.org.uk

The Association for the Study of Modern Italy (ASMI) is a professional society in the United Kingdom for historians, political scientists, geographers, art historians, economists, and specialists in cultural, film and media studies working on 19th- 20th- and 21st-century Italy. It was founded in 1982 by Christopher Seton-Watson, a historian of liberal Italy, and each year hosts a number of events including lectures, a postgraduate summer school and an international two-day conference. It also sponsors prizes and a variety of academic programmes and initiatives around the world devoted to the study of modern Italy. The themes of its annual conference have ranged from topics as diverse as migration, colonialism and law and order, to emotions, regionalism, the Italian crisis and war. It welcomes members of all countries.

== Modern Italy ==
Modern Italy is the journal of the Association. It is one of the leading journals of Italian Studies and it publishes peer-reviewed academic articles across a broad range of disciplines. Modern Italy, which is currently published by Cambridge University Press, is issued four times a year.

== Organisation ==
The association has an elected executive committee, with a chair, secretary, and treasurer. Previous chairs have included Denis Mack Smith, John Pollard, Russell King, David Forgacs, Perry Willson, Stephen Gundle, Christopher Duggan and Lucy Riall. The current chair is Professor Philip Cooke.
