= Hugh Seton-Watson =

British historian (1916–1984)

- Born: George Hugh Nicolas Seton-Watson; 15 February 1916; London
- Died: 19 December 1984 (aged 68); Washington, D.C.
- Education: New College, Oxford
- Occupation: Historian
- Years active: 1938–1984
- Employer: University of London
- Known for: Russia and Eastern Europe; Nationalism
- Notable work: The Decline of Imperial Russia, 1855–1914; The Russian Empire, 1801–1917; Nations and States: an Enquiry into the Origins of Nations and the Politics of Nationalism
- Spouse: Mary Seton-Watson (née Rokeling)
- Children: Ursula Sims-Williams; Catriona Seton-Watson; Lucy Seton-Watson
- Parent: Robert William Seton-Watson

George Hugh Nicolas Seton-Watson, CBE, FBA (15 February 1916 – 19 December 1984) was a British historian and political scientist specialising in Russia.

== Early life ==
Seton-Watson was one of the two sons of Robert William Seton-Watson, the activist and historian. His younger brother Christopher followed a similar career path. Hugh was educated at Winchester College and New College, Oxford, graduating in 1938 with First Class Honours in 'Modern Greats' (Philosophy, Politics and Economics).

== Wartime activities ==
After working for the British Foreign Office in Belgrade and Bucharest at the start of the Second World War, Seton-Watson joined the British Special Operations Executive. Interned by the Italians after the fall of Yugoslavia to the Axis in 1941, Seton-Watson was repatriated to Britain and later posted to the British special forces in Cairo, where he remained until 1944. In January 1944, he moved to Istanbul, where he performed intelligence activities among the refugees coming from the Balkans.

== Academic career ==
Seton-Watson wrote most of his first major work, Eastern Europe between the Wars, 1918–1941 in Cape Town while on his way from Italy to Britain after the fall of Yugoslavia, finishing it in Cairo during the battle of El Alamein in 1942.

In 1945 he was appointed praelector in politics at University College, Oxford. In 1951 he was appointed to the chair of Russian history at the University of London, where he remained until 1983, exercising a major influence over British and American understandings of Russia during the Cold War. He subsequently became the Professor Emeritus of Russian history.

Beginning in 1957 at Columbia University, he regularly visited institutions in the United States to lecture and conduct research. During a three-month fellowship, beginning in October 1984, at the Woodrow Wilson International Center for Scholars he became ill with pulmonary problems and was admitted to Georgetown University Hospital where he died three weeks later.

== Work ==
After publishing The Decline of Imperial Russia, 1855–1914 in 1952, Seton-Watson published his most famous work, The Russian Empire, 1801–1917 in 1967. This became the standard history of late imperial Russia for a generation.

Seton-Watson's Nations and States: an Enquiry into the Origins of Nations and the Politics of Nationalism (1977) made a fundamental contribution to the study of nationalism, though later overshadowed by the success of Benedict Anderson's more theoretical Imagined Communities.

The New York Times Book Review called him "the outstanding authority on the satellite countries of Eastern Europe".

== Honors ==
Seton-Watson became a Fellow of the British Academy in 1969, received a DLitt from Oxford in 1974 and an honorary doctorate from the University of Essex in 1983. In the 1981 New Year Honours he was appointed CBE.

== Bibliography ==
- Eastern Europe between the wars (Cambridge Univ. Press, 1945)
- Neither War Nor Peace: The Struggle for Power in the Postwar World (Frederick A. Praeger, 1960)
- The new imperialism: A background book (Bodley Head, 1961)
- Nationalism and communism: essays, 1946–1963 (Methuen, 1964)
- Nationalism old and new (Methuen, 1965)
- The Russian empire 1801–1917 (Clarendon, 1967) online
- The 'sick heart' of modern Europe: the problem of the Danubian lands (University of Washington Press, 1975)
- The imperialist revolutionaries: trends in world Communism in the 1960s and 1970s (Stanford: Hoover Institution Press, 1979.)
- Nations and states: an enquiry into the origins of nations and the politics of nationalism (Methuen, 1977)
- The imperialist revolutionaries (1979)
- Language and national consciousness (Oxford University Press, 1981)
- The making of a new Europe: R.W. Seton-Watson and the last years of Austria-Hungary. With Christopher Seton-Watson (Methuen, 1981)
- The decline of Imperial Russia 1855–1914 (Westview Press, 1985).
- The East European revolution (Westview Press, 1985)
- From Lenin to Khrushchev: the history of world communism (Westview Press, 1985)
- R.W. Seton-Watson and the Roumanians, 1906–20 (2 vols, Editura Științifică și Enciclopedică, București, 1988)
