= Andrew Hunter (minister) =

- mezzotint after a portrait by Henry Raeburn
- Born: 15 February 1744; Edinburgh
- Died: 21 April 1809; Edinburgh
- Employer: University of Edinburgh
- Spouse: Mainie Schaw Napier
- Children: 6

Andrew Hunter of Barjarg FRSE (1743–1809) was a Minister in Edinburgh. He was Moderator of the General Assembly of the Church of Scotland in 1792, was Professor of Divinity at the University of Edinburgh and a Founding Fellow of the Royal Society of Edinburgh.

== Life ==
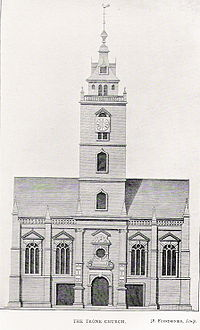
Engraving of the kirk as it looked before 1785

Andrew Hunter of Barjarg in Dumfriesshire, was born in 1743, the eldest son of Andrew Hunter, W.S, in Edinburgh, and Grizell Maxwell of Cardoness.

He was educated at the High School in Edinburgh and then studied Divinity at the University of Edinburgh under Rev Prof Robert Walker, but did not graduate. He then spent a year at the University of Utrecht furthering his studies in Calvinist theology. He was then made a licensed probationer by the Presbytery of Edinburgh in 1767, though it seemed he refused to take up any formal position while his father, whom he adored, lived. He was ordained as assistant minister ("Second Charge") in the "New Church" of the Parish of Dumfries, on 20 September 1770. He inherited Abbotshill on the death of his father, but sold the estate and instead purchased the estate of Barjarg near Dumfries from James Erskine in 1772 and remained for nine years.

He was awarded an honorary Doctor of Divinity (DD) by the University of Edinburgh in 1779 and later that year translated to New Greyfriars Church in Edinburgh, on 25 November 1779. This post was to be held in conjunction with the Professorship of Divinity at Edinburgh University, which he held jointly with the aging incumbent, Professor Hamilton, with no salary but with a view to succeeding him. From his own funds he establish a prize for the best theology essay by his students. On 21 October 1785, the Edinburgh Town Council presented him to the Tron Kirk, He took up post on 2 April 1786. The church at this time was undergoing major remodelling in order to facilitate a new north south route through the city to its immediate west (South Bridge/North Bridge). The Georgian obsession with symmetry also meant to building was trimmed on the west side, creating Hunter Square on that side.

Dr Hunter's lecturing and preaching style is described as "earnest and affectionate" and reports of his character portray him as amiable but unruffled. Even when urging against the dangers of public unrest, his language was "moderate and conciliatory". He was elected Moderator of Assembly on 17 May 1792. It was the time of the French Revolution and the British Government was anxious that the Church do all in its power to calm growing popular demands for political reform. The General Assembly was anxious to show its loyalty to the Government and passed motions urging Ministers to remind their parishioners forcibly of how blessed they were to live in a free country ruled over by a beneficent monarch. The Assembly sent congratulations to the Duke of York on his marriage to the Princess of Prussia and approved measures to promote the Protestant religion in the Highlands and Islands of Scotland (this was an annual measure, drawing upon funds specially donated by the Crown). In the year following he declined the customary appointment as one of His Majesty's Chaplains in Ordinary.

In 1783 he was a founding fellow of the Royal Society of Edinburgh (and of its predecessor, the Newtonian Society). He took part in its deliberations, though not always successfully. He once turned up to give a talk, with a mass of papers under his arm, announcing he would deal with twelve topics. The Preses (chairman) said he had twelve objections to this, and took some time to deliver them, followed by six members who took it in turn to add their objections. Dr Hunter listened glumly throughout the evening, then gathered his papers together and left in silence.

Andrew Hunter died at his home at the head of New Street on the Canongate in Edinburgh on 21 April 1809. He had collapsed suddenly "with an inflammation" after having returned from a Holy Fair (regional Communion Services) in Leith. He died after a few days illness, calmly assured of a future life.

He is buried in Canongate Kirkyard on the Royal Mile. His position at the Tron Kirk was filled by Rev Alexander Brunton

== Family ==
On 14 April 1779, he married the Hon. Marion (a.k.a. Mainy or Mary) Schaw Napier (born 5 Aug. 1756, died 9 Oct. 1806), the eldest daughter of William Napier, 7th Lord Napier, with whom he had three sons and three daughters. His daughter Grizel (a.k.a. Grace) Hunter (1784-1864) married George Ross advocate, third son of John Lockhart-Ross baronet.

His second son William Francis Hunter (1785-1827) inherited the Barjarg estate in 1809, Andrew's first son having died in infancy.

He was cousin to James William Hunter FRSE.

== Publications ==
- Advice from a father to a son, just entered into the army, and about to go abroad into action. In seven letters. 1776
- Christ drawing all men unto Him: a sermon, preached before the Edinburgh Missionary Society, in Lady Glenorchy's Chapel, on Thursday, 20 July. 1797, ... 1797
- Due attention to the public institutions of religion recommended. A sermon, preached at the opening of the General Assembly of the Church of Scotland, in the High church of Edinburgh, 16 May. 1793.
- Duties of subjects. A sermon preached in the Tron Church, Edin. 16 December 1792 1793
- Study of the scriptures recommended. : A sermon. Preached before the Society in Scotland for propagating Christian Knowledge, 9 June. 1775. / By Andrew Hunter, Minister of the Gospel in Dumfries. 1775
- The duties of the children of pious parents, a sermon, preached in the Tron Church of Edinburgh, 20 May 1803. Before the society ... for the benefit of the sons of the clergy of the Established Church of Scotland ... To which is added, an account of the objects and constitution of the society. 1803

== See also ==
- List of moderators of the General Assembly of the Church of Scotland

== Sources ==
- Scott, Hew 'Fasti ecclesiæ scoticanæ; the succession of ministers in the Church of Scotland from the reformation' Volume 1: synod of Lothian and Tweedale, p. 137, The Tron, Edinburgh 1915
- Kay, John A series of original portraits and caricature etchings, Volume 1, Part 2, page 298, Hugh Paton Edinburgh, 1838
- Macphail's Edinburgh ecclesiastical journal and literary review, Vol XXXI, page 239, Edinburgh, 1861
- Anderson, William The Scottish nation: or The surnames, families, literature, honours, and biographical history of the people of Scotland, Volume 2 p511. Edinburgh Fullarton & Co 1862
- Acts of the General Assembly of the Church of Scotland 1638–1842, Church Law Society, Edinburgh, 1843. (British History Online

Church of Scotland titles
Preceded by Robert Small	Moderator of the General Assembly of the Church of Scotland; 1792	Succeeded by Thomas Hardy
