= Stephen Gundle =

British cultural historian and film scholar

Stephen Gundle (born 23 November 1956) is a British cultural historian and film scholar. He is a Professor of Film and Television Studies at the University of Warwick. He is best known for his books and articles on Italian culture, politics and the mass media.

== Biography ==
=== Education ===
Stephen Gundle was born in Leicester. He studied Politics at Liverpool University and at the State University of New York in Binghamton, New York, before subsequently undertaking a PhD on the "Italian Communist Party and the cultural sphere" at the University of Cambridge under the supervision of Paul Ginsborg.

=== Academic career ===
Between 1984 and 1988, he was a Junior Research Fellow at Churchill College, Cambridge. He was appointed as a Tutorial Fellow in Politics at University College, Oxford, in 1989. In 1993, he took up a post at Royal Holloway, University of London, where he rose to become Professor of Italian Cultural History. In 2007, he left to become Professor of Film and Television Studies at Warwick. Gundle's interests have been mainly focussed on politics and mass culture in 20th century Italy. After researching the cultural policies of the Italian Communist Party, he focussed on the history of Italian cultural industries and especially cinema. He was principal investigator on large AHRC-backed research projects into the cult of personality of the Fascist dictator Benito Mussolini and into the practices of Italian film producers in the postwar decades. He has authored studies of the star system of Italian cinema in the Fascist and postwar periods, a history of the relationship between feminine beauty and Italian national identity, and an investigation into the background to the Wilma Montesi murder scandal in 1950s Rome. He also co-wrote, with the Italian designer Clino Trini Castelli, an analysis of the material culture of glamour, and authored the first history of glamour practices of Italian film producers in the postwar decades.

=== Honours ===
He has held several visiting professorships in France including at the Institut d’Etudes Politiques de Paris (SciencesPo). Between 2009-14 and 2015-16 he was chair of the Association for the Study of Modern Italy. In 2004 he was made an Ufficiale dell’Ordine al Merito della Repubblica Italiana (Officer of the Order of Merit of the Italian Republic).

== Works ==
- Between Hollywood and Moscow: The Italian Communists and the Challenge of Mass Culture (Duke University Press, 2000). First published in Italian by Giunti in 1995.
- The New Italian Republic: From the Fall of the Berlin Wall to Berlusconi (Routledge, 1995), co-edited with Simon Parker.
- The Glamour System (Palgrave, 2006) with Clino T. Castelli.
- Mass Culture and Italian Society from Fascism to the Cold War (Indiana University Press, 2007); with David Forgacs. Italian edition published by Il Mulino in 2007.
- Bellissima: Feminine Beauty and the Idea of Italy(Yale University Press, 2007); Italian edition published by Laterza in 2007.
- Assassinations and Murder in Modern Italy: Transformations in Society and Culture (Palgrave, 2007), co-edited with Lucia Rinaldi.
- Glamour: A History (Oxford University Press, 2008).
- Death and the Dolce Vita: The Dark Side of Rome in the 1950s. Spanish (Seix Barral) and Italian (Rizzoli) editions were published 2012 and an Indian edition (Mehta Publishing) in 2013.
- The Cult of the Duce: Mussolini and the Italians, with Christopher Duggan, Giuliana Pieri and others (Manchester University Press, 2013).
- Mussolini’s Dream Factory: Film Stardom in Fascist Italy (Berghahn Books, 2013).
- Fame Amid the Ruins: Italian Film Stardom in the Age of Neorealism (Berghahn Books, 2019).
