= William Livingstone Watson =

Scottish merchant and astronomer

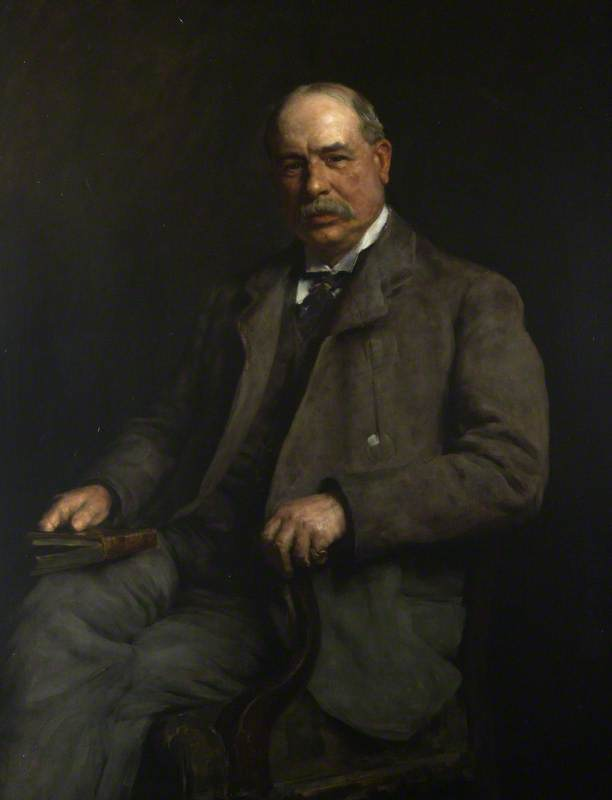
William Livingstone Watson, painted by Stanhope Forbes

Arms of William Livingstone Watson

William Livingstone Watson (1835 – May 1903) was a Scottish East India merchant and an astronomer.

== Early life ==
Watson was born in 1835 in Kinross, Scotland. He was educated at the University of Edinburgh and the University of Glasgow. Watson was originally intended for a career in the church but turned instead to the law and thence to business.

== Career ==
Watson joined a Glasgow firm of East India merchants, James Finlay & Co., in 1855. He became a partner in this firm in 1865, and in 1876 moved to London, where he was their representative. He also participated in a number of other business activities, serving for many years as chairman of the London board of the Royal Insurance Company, and also on a number of other boards, including the Merchants’ Marine Insurance Company, the Agra Bank, the Indo-China Steam Navigation Company, the Assam Bengal Railway, and the Clan Line.

== Astronomy ==
In 1888 Watson bought Ayton House in Perthshire, Scotland, and with it an observatory and one of the United Kingdom's largest telescopes, the 12-inch "great refractor" that has been exhibited at the Great Exhibition in 1851. He worked on this telescope with astronomers Ludwig Becker and Ralph Copeland. He was elected a fellow of the Royal Astronomical Society in 1892.

== Other activities ==
Watson was also a Justice of the Peace and a member of the Perthshire County Council. He was a devout Free Church Christian and a strict Sabbatarian, banning non-religious books and children's toys on Sundays. He worked with other temperance campaigners for the introduction of the Gothenburg System for controlling the consumption of alcoholic spirits.

== Personal life ==
Watson married Elizabeth Lindsay Seton, the daughter of George Seton, a genealogist and historian, in 1878, but his wife suffered from ill health after 1881, and their son R. W. Seton-Watson, the political activist and historian, later recalled that he had never seen his mother walking or standing. The household was run by Watson's sister Jeanie and then by a cousin, Mary Lorimer.

Watson died in Ayton, Perthshire, Scotland in May 1903.
