= George Seton =

British philanthropist and genealogist (1822–1908)

Seton of Careston George Seton FRSE
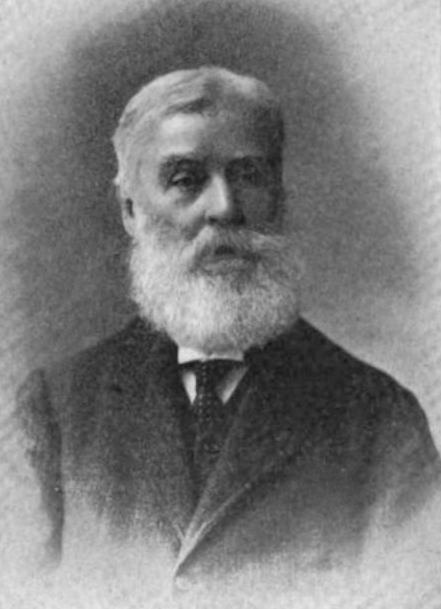
- Born: 25 June 1822; Perth, Scotland
- Died: 14 November 1908 (aged 86); Edinburgh, Scotland
- Education: Royal High School, Edinburgh; University of Edinburgh, Law
- Alma mater: University of Oxford (1845)
- Years active: 1846–1889
- Known for: Philanthropy and genealogy
- Title: General Registrar Officer, Scotland
- Term: 1854–1889
- Parent: 2

George Seton of Careston FRSE FSA (25 June 1822 – 14 November 1908) was a Scottish philanthropist and genealogist.

== Early life ==
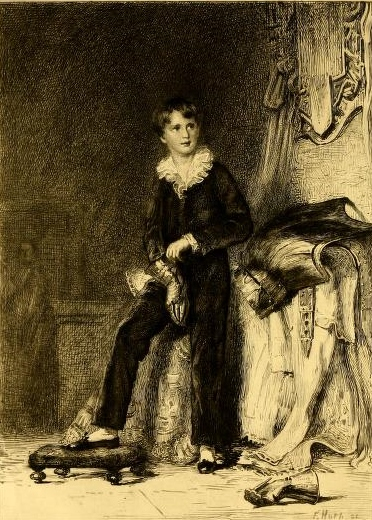
Seaton as a child

Seton was born in Perth, Scotland, the son of Captain George Seton, an officer in the East India Company, and his wife, Margaret Hunter. The family lived at Potterhill, Bridgend, east across the River Tay from Perth. Seton was educated at Royal High School, Edinburgh, then studied law at University of Edinburgh, and Exeter College, and finally Oxford, from which he graduated in 1845.

== Later life ==
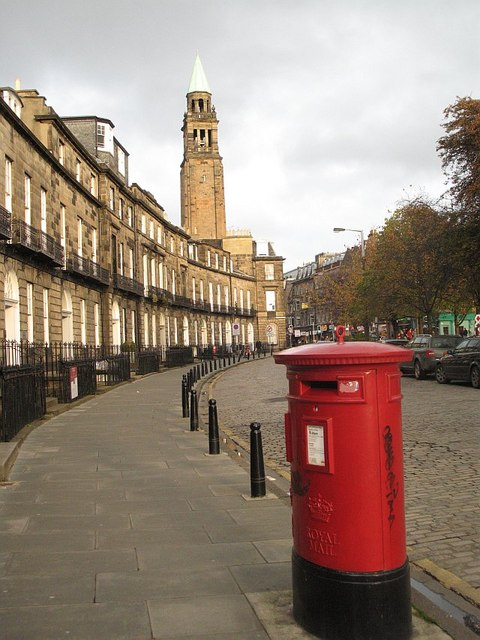
Coates Crescent in Edinburgh

Seton qualified as an advocate, passing the Scottish bar in 1846. Although Seton did practice as an advocate he soon focussed upon various other public offices: firstly as secretary to the Registrar General for Scotland (from 1854) and as Superintendent of the Civil Service examinations in Scotland (from 1862). As an advocate he lived at worked from 13 Coates Crescent in Edinburgh's West End.

Seton was one of the founders of the St Andrew Boat Club, the first vice-chairman of the Society for Improving the Condition of the Poor, a fellow of the Society of Antiquaries of Scotland. He was elected a Fellow of the Royal Society of Edinburgh in 1872 his proposer being Philip Kelland. However, his real love was genealogy, and in 1863 he published The Law and Practice of Heraldry in Scotland.

He retired in 1889.

In later life he lived at "St Benets", 42 Greenhill Gardens in south-west Edinburgh. The house was designed by John Henderson in 1860. The house was later acquired by the Roman Catholic Church and serves as the home for the Archbishop of St Andrews and Edinburgh.

George Seton died at his home in Edinburgh on 14 November 1908, aged 86.

== Family ==
On September 26, 1849, in Edinburgh, Seton married Sarah Elizabeth Hunter (1819–1883), second daughter of James William Hunter FRSE. One of their daughters, Elizabeth Lindsay Seton (1850–1899), married William Livingstone Watson (1835–1903). One of their sons, George Seton (1852–1929), was a tea-planter in India then set up business in London.

== Tall soldiers ==
Over 6 feet 5 inches (1.96 metres) in height, Seton served in the Royal Company of Archers and in 1859 raised his own company of volunteer grenadier artillerymen, all of whom were over 6 feet tall.

== Works ==
- Genealogical Tables of the Kings of England and Scotland (1845)
- Treatment of Social Evils (1853)
- Sketch of the History and Imperfect Condition of the Parochial Records of Scotland (1854)
- The Law and Practice of Heraldry in Scotland. Edinburgh: Edmonston and Douglas. OCLC 60730990 (all editions), 1048540754, 838634877.
1. Via Internet Archive (Robarts).
2. Via Internet Archive (Harvard).
- Gossip about Letters and Letter Writers (1870)
- The Convent of St Catherine of Sienna in Edinburgh (1871)
- The Social Pyramid (1878)
- St Kilda Past and Present (1878)
- Amusements for the People (1880)
- The Life of Alexander Seton, Earl of Dunfermline (1888)
- The House of Moncrieff (1890)
- History of the Family of Seton (2 vols., 1896)
