= Epitome Astronomiae Copernicanae =

Book by Johannes Kepler

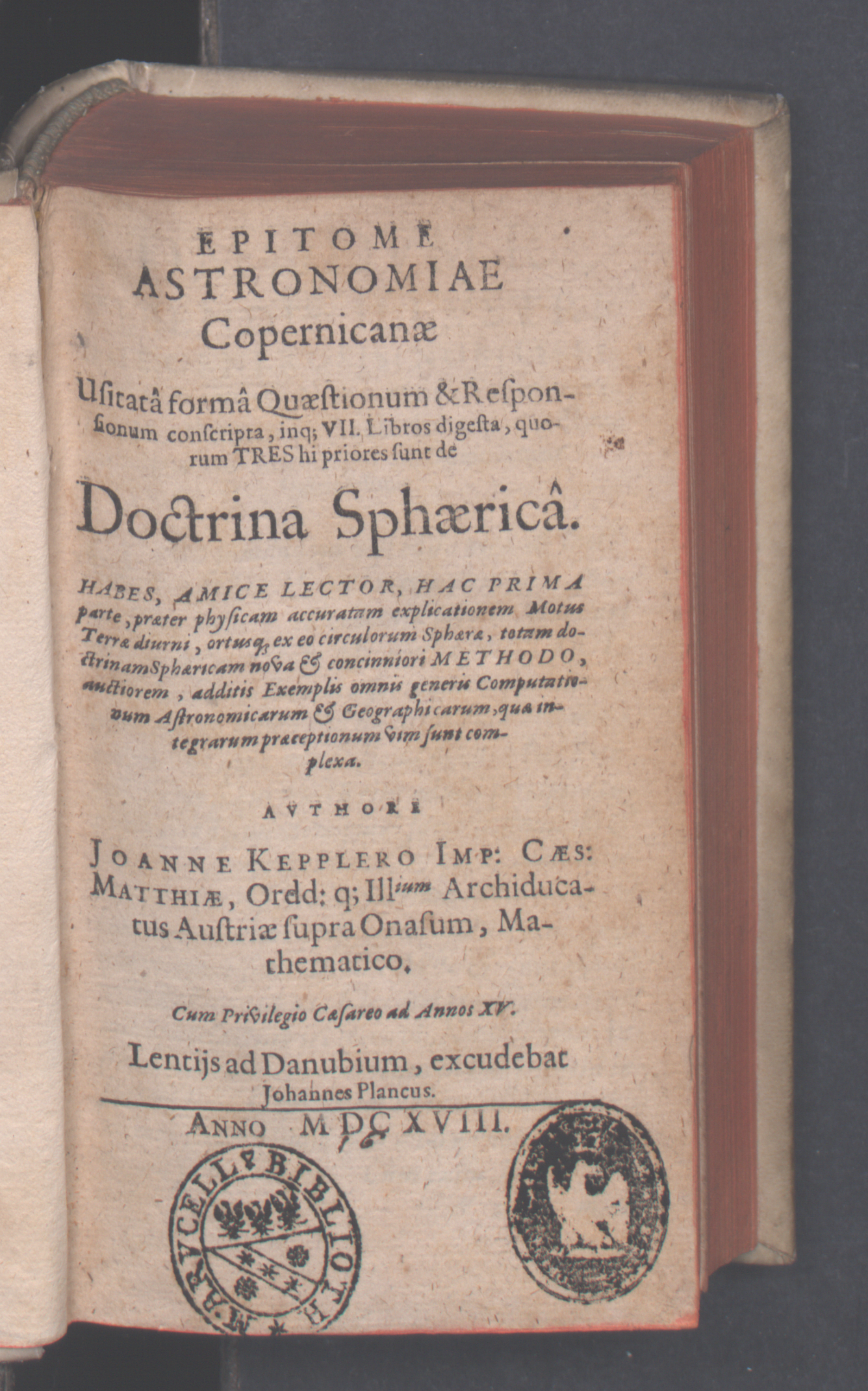
- Epitome astronomiae copernicanae (1618)
- Author: Johannes Kepler
- Publication date: 1618

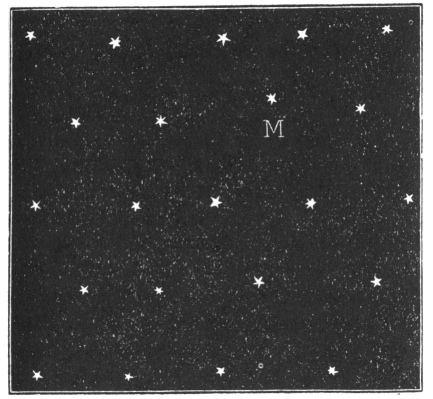
Kepler's Figure 'M' from the Epitome, showing the world as belonging to just one of any number of similar stars

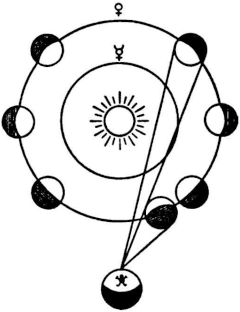
Diagram of the phases of Venus as viewed by an observer on Earth

The Epitome Astronomiae Copernicanae is an astronomy book on the heliocentric system published by Johannes Kepler in the period 1618 to 1621. The first volume (books I–III) was printed in 1618, the second (book IV) in 1620, and the third (books V–VII) in 1621.

== Content ==
The book contained in particular the first version in print of his third law of planetary motion. The work was intended as a textbook, and the first part was written by 1615. Divided into seven books, the Epitome covers much of Kepler's earlier thinking, as well as his later positions on physics, metaphysics and archetypes. In Book IV he supported the Copernican cosmology. Book V provided mathematics underpinning Kepler's views. Kepler wrote and published this work in parallel with his Harmonices Mundi (1619), the last Books V to VII appearing in 1621.

Kepler introduced the idea that the physical laws determining the motion of planets around the Sun were the same governing the motion of moons around planets. He justified this claim in Book IV using the telescope observations of the moons of Jupiter made by Simon Marius in his 1614 book Mundus Iovialis. The period of orbits and relative distances of the four moons satisfied Kepler's third law and he argued the Jovian system was like a mini Solar System.

The term "inertia" was first introduced in the Epitome.

== Reception ==
Due to the book's support for heliocentrism, the first volume was put on the Index of Prohibited Books on 28 February 1619.

== Editions ==
- 1635 reprint: Epitome Astronomiae Copernicanae, Vols. 1–3, Schönwetterus.

== Translations ==
- 1939: Epitome of Copernican astronomy. Books IV and V, The organization of the world and the doctrine ...; trans. by Charles Glenn Wallis. Annapolis: St John's Bookstore.
- 1955: Reissued with Ptolemy's Almagest. Chicago: Encyclopædia Britannica (1955).
- 1995: Epitome of Copernican astronomy; & Harmonies of the world; translated by Charles Glenn Wallis. Amherst: Prometheus Books.
