= John Walker (natural historian) =

Scottish minister and natural historian (1731–1803)

John Walker FRSE
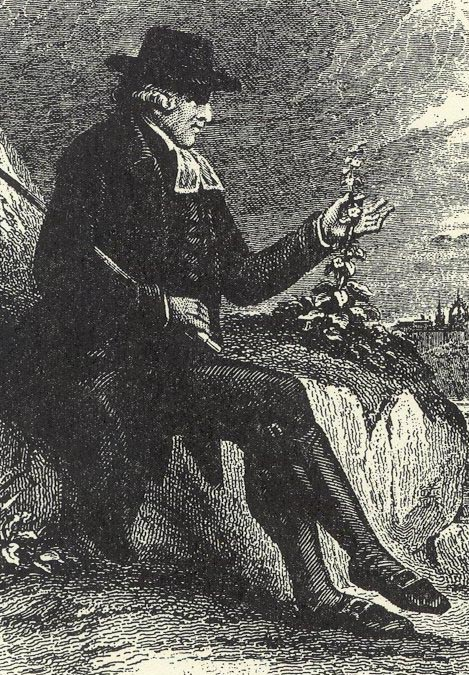
- Rev Dr John Walker, Edinburgh's Professor of Natural History
- Born: 1731; Canongate, Edinburgh, Scotland
- Died: 31 December 1803
- Education: Canongate Grammar School
- Alma mater: University of Edinburgh (DD; MD)
- Occupations: Professor of natural history, University of Edinburgh; moderator of the General Assembly of the Church of Scotland
- Notable work: Schediasma Fossilium (1781); Delineato Fossilium (1782); Classes Fossilium: Sive Characteres Naturales et Chymici Classium et Ordinum in Systemate Minerali (1787); Institutes of Natural History (1792); An economical history of the Hebrides and Highlands of Scotland (1808); Essays on Natural History and Rural Economy (1812)
- Spouse: Jane Wallace Wauchope (m. 1789; d. 1827)

Notes
- Fellowships: Royal Society of Edinburgh, American Philosophical Society, Highland Society

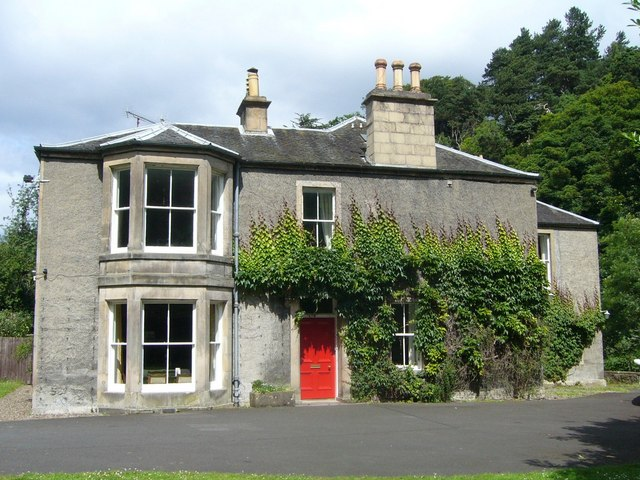
Colinton Manse

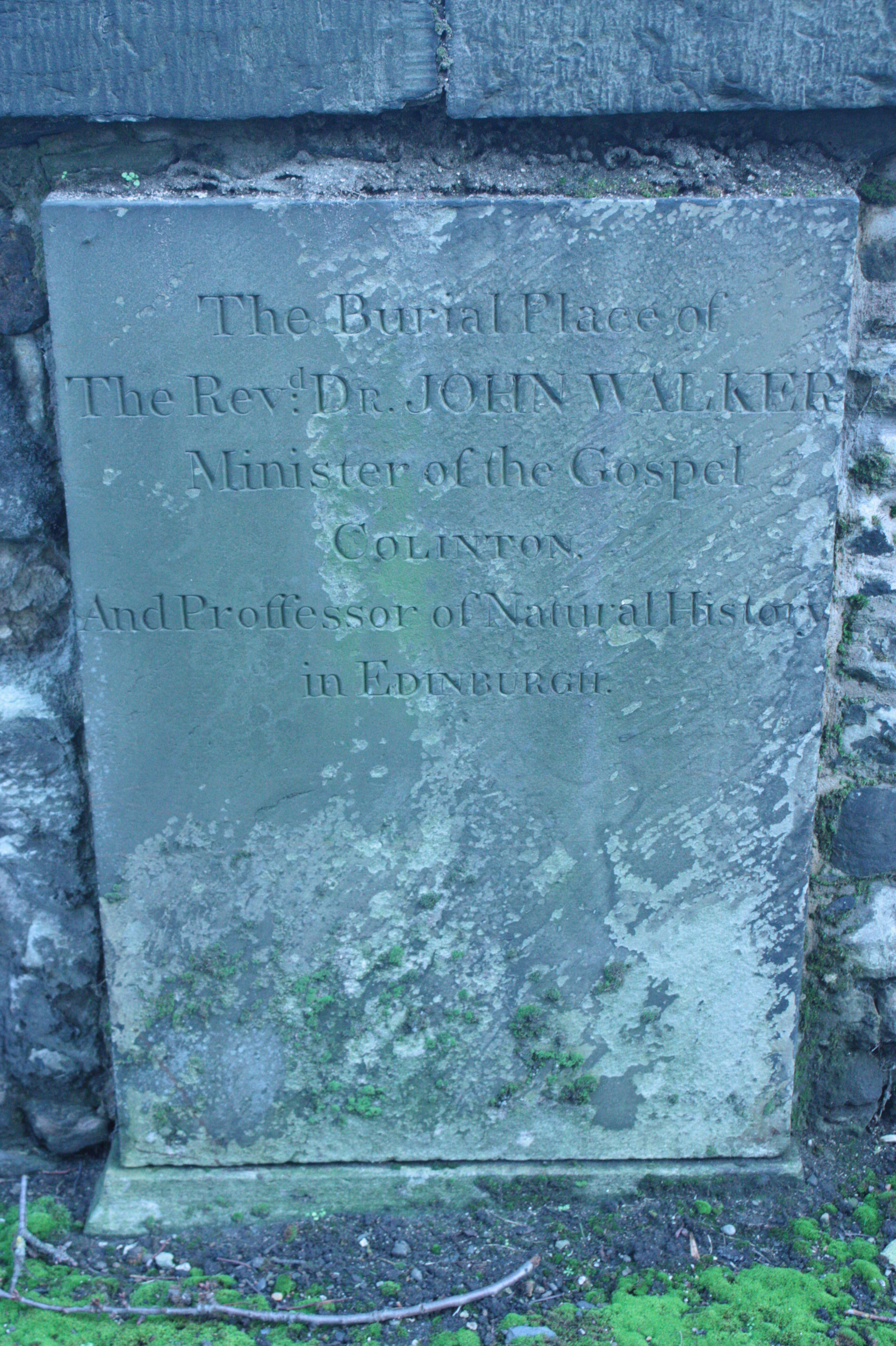
The grave of Prof John Walker, Canongate Kirkyard, Edinburgh

John Walker FRSE (1731–1803) was a Scottish minister and natural historian. He was Regius professor of natural history at the University of Edinburgh from 1779 to 1803. He was joint founder of the Royal Society of Edinburgh in 1783 and moderator of the General Assembly of the Church of Scotland in 1790.

== Overview ==
Walker was a protégé of chemist William Cullen and a colleague of Dugald Stewart, Joseph Black, and several other Edinburgh professors, who shaped the intellectual milieu of the Scottish Enlightenment. During his long career, he became a distinguished botanist, chemist, geologist, hydrologist, meteorologist, mineralogist, zoologist, and economic historian, as well as being a minister in the Church of Scotland.

Walker was one of the main scientific consultants of his day, serving as an agricultural, industrial, or mining advisor to many influential Scottish landowners, including the judge advocate Lord Kames, George III's prime minister Lord Bute, and Lord Hopetoun. Many of his students went on to become leading scientists in 19th-century Scotland, England, Ireland, and America. He was a pioneer in introducing agricultural topics into a university curriculum.

As a member of the Philosophical Society of Edinburgh when it received its royal charter, Walker automatically became a fellow of the Royal Society of Edinburgh in 1783, going on to serve as secretary of the Society's physical section (1789–96). He was elected as moderator of the General Assembly of the Church of Scotland in 1790.

== Early life ==
He was born in Canongate, Edinburgh, the eldest son of Eupham Morison and John Walker, the rector of the Canongate Grammar School. He was educated at his father's school.

He matriculated at the University of Edinburgh in 1746. Like many aspiring men in Scotland at this time, he took a divinity degree in 1749. He was licensed to preach by the Presbytery of Kirkcudbright in 1754, but was not ordained into the Church of Scotland until 1758, initially being minister of Glencorse just south of Edinburgh, moving to Moffat in 1762 and to Lochmaben. He accepted the post of professor of natural history at the University of Edinburgh in the same year, and quickly found the two roles incompatible. In 1783, he returned to the church as minister of Colinton, a parish in south-west Edinburgh. Held in high esteem, he was elected moderator of the General Assembly in 1790. He lived in Colinton manse from 1783 to 1803. He became blind around 1800m but continued to preach until death.

His religious duties, though, did not stop him from pursuing scientific subjects in his spare time. While at university, he took natural philosophy courses and collected natural history specimens in and around the Lothians. During the 1750s, he continued to pursue scientific subjects by studying chemistry under Professor William Cullen and by joining Edinburgh's Philosophical Society. He distinguished himself not only by winning awards from the society, but also by publishing an article in the 1757 edition of the Philosophical Transactions of the Royal Society of London. Under Cullen's patronage, Walker further distinguished himself as a chemist and a mineralogist, and this led him to function as a scientific advisor for Lord Bute, Lord Hopetoun, Lord Cathcart, and Judge Advocate Lord Kames.

== Becoming a naturalist ==
During the 1760s, he used his aristocratic connections to tour mines throughout the Lowlands and to assemble his own sizeable mineralogical collection. By the mid-1760s, Walker was known as one of Scotland's leading lay naturalists. This motivated the Church of Scotland and the Board of Annexed Estates to send him on exploratory tours of the Highland and Hebrides in 1764 and 1771. These tours allowed him to make religious and ethnographic observations for the church and to take scientifically oriented notes on northern Scotland's minerals, plants, animals, and climate. In his 1764 tour, while on visit to the island of Jura (Deer Island), Walker may have made the first detailed description of Lyme disease. He gives a good description both of the symptoms (with "exquisite pain [in] the interior parts of the limbs") and of the tick vector itself, which he describes as a "worm" with a body which is "of a reddish colour and of a compressed shape with a row of feet on each side" that "penetrates the skin". Also during this period, he collected samples of the mineral that came to be known as strontianite from its type locality, thus setting in process the identification and analysis of the new alkaline earth strontium.

During the 1770s Walker published articles in The Scots Magazine and the Philosophical Transactions. By the middle part of the decade, Robert Ramsay, the University of Edinburgh's ailing professor of natural history, clearly would soon need to be replaced. After securing the support of William Cullen, Lord Kames, and several other politically savvy intellectuals, Walker competed against William Smellie, a well-respected natural historian and influential publisher, for the post. After much wrangling, Walker won the contest and was appointed in 1779. He held the position until his death in 1803.

== Later life ==
Walker's natural history lectures spanned the academic year and were divided into two sections. The first half of the year he gave his "Hippocratean" lectures, that is, meteorology, hydrology, and geology. The second half of the year was devoted to the three kingdoms of nature - minerals, plants, and animals. During the 1760s, he had accepted Linnaeus' binomial classification system and during his university tenure, he readily applied it to botany. He did not agree with Linnaeus' classification of minerals and animals, however, so he developed his own unique system for both of these subjects. As shown by Matthew Daniel Eddy, Walker developed a sophisticated theory of the earth based on evidence gathered from geochemistry and human history. Throughout his entire career, he kept his ties with the Church of Scotland, and in 1790, he was elected to be moderator, its highest position. Sometime in the late 1790s, he began to lose his sight, and several of his lectures were taken over by Dr Robert Jameson, a physician and former student, who had also studied in mainland Europe. By the time that he died in 1803, Walker had taught well over 800 students, some of whom went on to have a significant impact on 19th-century natural history. Some of these names include Rev. Prof. John Playfair, Sir James Edward Smith, Sir James Hall, Mungo Park, Robert Waring Darwin, Robert Brown, Thomas Beddoes, Thomas Charles Hope, and Samuel Latham Mitchell.

He died at his Edinburgh home at 1 St John Street on the Canongate on 31 December 1803, and is buried in Canongate Kirkyard on the Royal Mile in Edinburgh, just east of the church building.

== Family ==
In 1789, he married Jane Wallace Wauchope.

Church of Scotland titles
| Preceded by George Hill | Moderator of the General Assembly of the Church of Scotland; 1790 | Succeeded by Robert Small |
