= Robert Small (minister) =

Scottish minister

Robert Small FRSE (1732–1808) was a Scottish minister who served as Moderator of the General Assembly of the Church of Scotland in 1791. He was keenly interested in mathematics and astronomy and was a founder member of the Royal Society of Edinburgh, (elected Fellow on 17 November 1783) to whose Transactions he contributed a paper proving some theorems in geometry. He was Minister of the first charge (St Mary's) in the Parish of Dundee, and used his mathematical abilities to compile, in 1792, an exemplary Report on his Parish for the First Statistical Account of Scotland. In 1804 he published an explanation of Kepler's laws of planetary motion. He was very active in social improvements in his parish, organising (in conjunction with Robert Stewart, a surgeon) a subscription for Voluntary Dispensary, and Surgery, which eventually became Dundee Royal Infirmary.

== Life ==
Small was born on 12 December 1732 in Carmyllie, Angus, the son of Rev. James Small (d.1771), the local minister, and his wife, Lillias Scott. As was normal with the clergy he was from a gentrified background.

Robert received his education at Dundee Grammar School. He then studied Divinity at the University of St Andrews graduating BD around 1750. He was elected by the Town Council of Dundee to be preacher in the Cross Church and catechist and took up post on 2 May 1759. He was called to be minister of the first charge of the Parish of Dundee, St Mary's, where he was ordained on 20 May 1761. He was appointed chaplain to the Royal Highlanders (83rd Foot) in 1778. He was awarded an honorary doctorate (DD) by his alma mater in the same year. In 1783 he was a co-founder of the Royal Society of Edinburgh.

He was called before the General Assembly to reply to charges that, when ordaining Elders, on 9 September 1798, in his Parish he asked unconventional, surprise questions, and did not require them to subscribe to the Westminster Confession of Faith. He was admonished and warned to be more careful in future. On Thursday 29 May 1800, the Assembly voted to

enjoin Dr Small to be careful hereafter, to testify, by his whole conduct, that respect for the Standards of this Church, and for the fences wisely provided by our Ecclesiastical Constitution, against dangerous innovation, which corresponds to the declaration stated in his defences, as repeatedly made by him in the Kirk-session of Dundee, that he glorified in the Confession of Faith.

He was reputed to be an excellent classical scholar and an interesting preacher, well versed in natural philosophy and mathematics and was a patron of literature.

His brother, William was by profession a physician but seems to was more active in scientific and industrial concerns. He emigrated for a time to Virginia, where he was Professor of Mathematics at the College of William & Mary and tutored Thomas Jefferson, but returned to Britain, carrying a letter of introduction from Benjamin Franklin to the industrialist Matthew Boulton. In turn, Dr Small introduced Boulton to James Watt. Robert Small was an integral part of the Scottish Enlightenment with worldwide connections to the broader Enlightenment. Both the Small brothers played a crucial part in the education of the economist and mathematician William Playfair . Robert, in particular, recommended Playfair to James Watt for the position of draughtsman and assistant.

He died on 23 August 1808 . He is buried in the churchyard of St Andrews Cathedral.

== Family ==
On 24 April 1764 Robert married Jean Yeaman of Blacklaw, daughter of a Patrick Yeaman of Blacklaw, a merchant and twice Provost of Dundee. His children were, Isabel, Lillias, James, Catherine and Agnes.

His son, James, is described (in Fasti Ecclesiae) as "a manufacturer in Dundee, whose failure in business ruined his father".

== Publications ==
- An account of the astronomical discoveries of Kepler (published by J Mawman, London 1804)
- Demonstrations of some of Dr Matthew Stewart's General Theorems, Transactions of the Royal Society of Edinburgh, Vol 2, 1785, read by the author 7 February 1785
- The Importance of the Poor illustrated in a sermon preached, 15 December 1793, on the occasion of making a charitable contribution, for the support of the Sunday-schools, lately opened in ... Dundee 1793 sold by Edward Lesslie
- Defence delivered by Dr. Small, at the bar of the General Assembly, Edinburgh, 1800.
- Statistical Account of Scotland, Vol 8, Number XI, page 192 et seq Town and Parish of Dundee by Rev Robert Small DD one of the Ministers of that City, Edinburgh 1792
- The history of Dundee, from its origin to the present time : with a copious appendix containing a translation of the charter given by Charles I (Separately published version of his Statistical Report) Edinburgh 1842

== See also ==
- List of moderators of the General Assembly of the Church of Scotland

== Sources ==
- Scott, Hew Fasti ecclesiæ scoticanæ; the succession of ministers in the Church of Scotland from the reformation Vol V Synods of Fife and of Angus and Mearns, page 317, Edinburgh 1925
- Royal Society of Edinburgh Founder Members
- Acts of the General Assembly of the Church of Scotland 1638–1842, Church Law Society, Edinburgh 1843.
- James Patrick Muirhead, The Life of James Watt: with selections from his correspondence, J. Murray, London, 1858
- Descendants of James and Lillias Scott Small, Genealogy of David L. Craig
- The Dundee book: an anthology of living in the city, Billy Kay, Mainstream, 1990

Church of Scotland titles
| Preceded by John Walker | Moderator of the General Assembly of the Church of Scotland; 1791 | Succeeded by Andrew Hunter |
