= Denis Mack Smith =

English historian

Denis Mack Smith CBE FBA FRSL
- Portrait at All Souls College
- Born: March 3, 1920; Hampstead, England
- Died: July 11, 2017 (aged 97); Oxford, England

Academic background
- Education: University of Cambridge (M.A.)
- Academic advisor: Herbert Butterfield

Academic work
- Discipline: History
- Sub-discipline: Italian history, modern history
- Institutions: University of Cambridge (1947–62); University of Oxford (1962–87)
- Doctoral students: Christopher Duggan
- Main interests: Risorgimento, Italian fascism
- Notable works: Modern Italy: A Political History

Denis Mack Smith, CBE (March 3, 1920 – July 11, 2017) was an English historian who specialized in the history of Italy from the Risorgimento onwards. He is best known for his biographies of Garibaldi, Cavour and Mussolini, and for his single-volume Modern Italy: A Political History. He was granted Italy's highest civilian honor in 1996.

== Early life ==
Denis Mack Smith was born in Hampstead (north London), the son of tax inspector Wilfrid Mack Smith (1891–1975) and Altiora Edith Gauntlett (1888–1969). He was educated at St Paul's Cathedral Choir School and Haileybury College, where Martin Wight was one of his tutors.

He won an organ scholarship in 1939 to study at Peterhouse, Cambridge, becoming the first in his family to attend university. There, he studied history and taught himself Italian. Mack Smith's interest in Italy began with his love of music during school and was fomented by an encounter with G. M. Trevelyan, although his main influence at Cambridge was the historian Herbert Butterfield, a harsh critic of Trevelyan's Whig tradition and romantic views of Italian unification.

== Career ==
Mack Smith took a break from Cambridge to serve in World War II, where he was attached to the British Cabinet Office from 1942 to 1946. He returned to complete his degree in 1947. After graduating from Cambridge, Mack Smith taught at Clifton College in Bristol for one year.

In 1946, Mack Smith spent an extended period in Italy researching archival material relating to Sicily in 1860. He later recounted that he "passed entire months without talking to anyone" during this period. As Italy was still recovering from the Second World War, people were throwing out books that had enjoyed favour during the fascist period. Mack Smith bought up vast amounts from street stalls and sent them back to England, thus forming the basis of a personal library that would aid his writing. During his visit, the philosopher Benedetto Croce took the young Mack Smith in as protégé even though they had vastly different views on Mussolini, and Croce gave him access to the library of his house in Naples. In later years, he entertained Italian scholars at his house near Oxford and gave them books from this extensive collection. His visit to Sicily was the basis for his two-volume work A History of Sicily (1968), written with Moses Finley.

He became a fellow at Peterhouse in 1947 and worked as a tutor and lecturer at Cambridge for fifteen years.

In 1954, he published his landmark first book, Cavour and Garibaldi: a Study in Political Conflict, which traced the origins of fascism to the shortcomings of Italian unification. Mack Smith challenged the traditional nationalist view of the period as one of heroic and unified struggle, instead portraying it as a series of political and social conflicts marked by rivalries among elites, tensions between church and state, and foreign interference. Using extensive documentary evidence, he depicted key figures such as Camillo Benso, Giuseppe Garibaldi and Victor Emmanuel II in a critical light. The book was noted for overturning long-held orthodoxies in Italian historiography, with historian David Gilmour stating that it "upset a well-defended orthodoxy that had been entrenched for almost a century." Historian Jonathan Steinberg stated that the book told Italians "what they did not want to hear". The best-selling book launched Mack Smith's career and became the standard English-language text on modern Italy.

In 1961, he was elected to a Senior Research Fellowship at All Souls College, Oxford, a position he held until he retired in 1987, and was an Emeritus Fellow until his death. He became a foreign honorary member of the American Academy of Arts and Sciences in 1972 and was elected to a Fellowship of the British Academy in 1976. Mack Smith published a study of Mussolini’s foreign policy the same year, followed in 1981 by a biography of the fascist leader. He authored an anthology of texts (The Making of Italy 1796–1870), numerous essays and articles, and wrote highly acclaimed biographies of Count Cavour and Giuseppe Mazzini, and a history of the Monarchy of Italy. Mack Smith acted as public orator in San Marino in 1982 before publishing Modern Italy: a Political History in 1997 with Yale University Press. He was elected to the Royal Society of Literature and served as chairman of the Association for the Study of Modern Italy from 1987.

Though his work on Italian history has been criticized by Italian academics, including Rosario Romeo and Renzo De Felice, since their first translations were published in the 1950s, Mack Smith remains the second best-selling author on Italian history after Indro Montanelli. Other Italian academics were outraged over Mack Smith's refusal "to regard Italian fascism and the rise of Benito Mussolini as an aberration". Mack Smith contended that one of the causes of Italian fascism was the structural weaknesses that existed in the Italian political system, a lasting "legacy of the Risorgimento".

While celebrated as writing original, serious and scrupulously researched history, he was also noted for writing in a clear, readable and engaging style replete with quotable lines. For instance, he wrote of Cavour that he had "managed to persuade people to back a revolution on the excuse that this was the way to prevent a revolution". Others note of his oeuvre that he "remained obstinately English, sceptical, observant and sometimes bitingly ironic".

Smith has been considered the world's leading scholar on Italian history for the English world. He belonged to the post-World War II generation of Cambridge historians, many based at Peterhouse, who learned to appreciate the primacy of documentary evidence. He was an Honorary Fellow of Wolfson College, Oxford, and received Italy's highest civilian honor in 1996.

== Personal life ==
His first marriage was to Ruth Hellmann (later Viscountess Runciman) in 1959, although their union was dissolved in 1962. He remarried in 1967 to Catherine Stevenson. They lived together in Headington, outside Oxford, where they hosted students and intellectuals.

Mack Smith had two daughters, Sophie and Jacintha, and four grandchildren, Stephanie, Tosca, Jonah and Theo.

== Awards ==
- Presidential Medal of Italy (1984)
- Polifemo d'Argento (1988)
- Order of the British Empire (1990)
- Fregene (1990)
- Sileno d'Oro (1996)
- Grand Officer of the Order of Merit of the Italian Republic (1996)
- Honorary Citizen of Santa Margherita Ligure (1999)

== Bibliography ==
- Cavour and Garibaldi, 1860: A Study in Political Conflict, 1954.
- Garibaldi: A Great Life in Brief, 1956.
- Italy: A Modern History, 1958, revised 1969.
  - completely revised and reprinted as Modern Italy: A Political History, 1997.
- A History of Sicily, with Moses Finley, in two volumes: Medieval Sicily 800-1713 and Modern Sicily after 1713, 1968.
  - abridged and reprinted as the single volume A History of Sicily with Moses Finley and Christopher Duggan, 1986.
- The Making of Italy, 1796-1870, 1968 (editor).
  - reprinted as The Making of Italy, 1796-1866, 1988.
- Great Lives Observed: Garibaldi, 1969 (editor).
- Victor Emmanuel, Cavour and the Risorgimento, 1971.
- Vittorio Emanuele II, 1975.
- Mussolini's Roman Empire (Le guerre del Duce), 1976.
- Mussolini, 1981. ISBN 0394506944
- Cavour, 1985.
- Il Risorgimento italiano. Storia e testi, 1987.
- Italy and Its Monarchy, 1989. ISBN 0300046618
- Mazzini, 1994. ISBN 0300058845
- La storia manipolata, 1998.

=== With others ===
- John Anthony Davis and Paul Ginsborg, eds. Society and Politics in the Age of the Risorgimento: Essays in Honour of Denis Mack Smith. Ten essays, including "Francesco De Sanctis: the politics of a literary critic", by Denis Mack Smith. Cambridge: Cambridge University Press, 2002. ISBN 0521526450.
