= Christopher Seton-Watson =

British soldier and historian

Christopher Seton-Watson MC* (London, England, August 6, 1918 – London, England, September 8, 2007) was a British soldier and historian specializing in political science and Italian history. He taught at Oxford University, and was the founder of the Association for the Study of Modern Italy.

== Education and early life ==
Seton-Watson was one of the two sons of Robert William Seton-Watson, the activist and historian. His older brother Hugh followed a similar career path. Christopher was educated at Winchester College and New College, Oxford. As a visiting student at Princeton, he regularly shared a taxi with Albert Einstein.

== Wartime activities ==
During the Second World War, Seton-Watson served in the Royal Artillery. He saw action during the Battle of France and was evacuated at Dunkirk. He then took part in the Greek campaign, the North African Campaign (including the Battles of El Alamein) and the Italian Campaign. He was promoted to the rank of major and awarded the Military Cross with bar. He wrote about those experiences in Dunkirk-Alamein-Bologna: Letters and Diaries of an Artilleryman 1939-1945.

== Academic career ==
In 1946, Seton-Watson was elected to a fellowship in Modern History and Politics at Oriel College, Oxford, on being awarded an MA as a war degree. He remained at Oriel until his retirement in 1983 and worked on liberal Italy (1870–1922) and its foreign policy. His best-known work was Italy from Liberalism to Fascism, 1870-1925 (1967). In 1982, he founded the Association for the Study of Modern Italy.

While at Oriel, he focused on teaching and also served as a "talent scout" for the British security services.

== Honours ==
- Military Cross (1940); bar 1944
- Commander of the Order of Merit of the Italian Republic (1984)

== Works ==
- Italy from liberalism to fascism, 1870-1925. London, Methuen; New York, Barnes & Noble, 1967.
- The making of a new Europe: R.W. Seton-Watson and the last years of Austria-Hungary. With Hugh Seton-Watson. Seattle: University of Washington Press, 1981.
- Italia e Inghilterra nell'età dell'imperialismo. With Enrico Serra. Milan: Istituto per gli studi di politica internazionale, 1990.
- British documents on foreign affairs--reports and papers from the Foreign Office confidential print. Part II, From the First to the Second World War. Series F, Europe, 1919–1939. With Kenneth Bourne and Donald Cameron Watt. Frederick, Md. : University Publications of America, 1990–96.
- Dunkirk, Alamein, Bologna: letters and diaries of an artilleryman, 1939-1945. London : Buckland, 1993.
