= Christopher Duggan =

British historian and academic (1957–2015)

Professor Christopher Duggan
- Duggan at an award ceremony in 2013
- Born: Christopher John Hesketh Duggan; 4 November 1957; Petts Wood, Kent, England
- Died: 2 November 2015 (aged 57); Twickenham, London, England
- Title: Professor of Modern Italian History
- Spouse: Jennifer Mundy
- Children: Two

Academic background
- Education: Dulwich College; Westminster School
- Alma mater: Merton College, Oxford
- Thesis: Fascism's campaign against the mafia (1985)
- Doctoral advisor: Denis Mack Smith

Academic work
- Discipline: History
- Sub-discipline: Modern Italian history; Modern Italian culture; Politics of Italy
- Institutions: Wolfson College, Oxford; All Souls College, Oxford; University of Reading

Christopher John Hesketh Duggan (4 November 1957 – 2 November 2015) was a British historian and academic. He specialised in the political, social and cultural history of modern Italy. He began his career as a research fellow at Wolfson College, Oxford and then at All Souls College, Oxford. In 1987, he moved to the University of Reading where he remained until his death. He was Professor of Modern Italian History from 2002.

== Early life and education ==
On 4 November 1957, Duggan was born to Margaret (née Hesketh) and John Duggan in Petts Wood, Kent, England. His mother was a nurse and social worker, and his father worked as a shipbroker. He was educated at Dulwich College, an all-boys public school in London, and at Westminster School, an all-boys public school in the grounds of Westminster Abbey. At the age of 11, he won an essay competition and was awarded a Mediterranean cruise as the prize.

Between school and university, Duggan went on holiday to Italy and explored the country on a Honda CB175 motorbike. He then studied history at Merton College, Oxford. He was mostly interested in medieval history at the beginning of his studies, but became interested in the history of modern Italy after being taught by Denis Mack Smith. He graduated with a first class Bachelor of Arts (BA) degree in 1979 with one of the top firsts of his year.

Having completed his bachelor's degree, Duggan spent a year living in Italy. He once had his flat raided by the DIGOS, the Italian anti-terrorist and organised crime unit, because they suspected him of being a foreign subversive; however, he was not arrested or charged. He returned to the University of Oxford to complete a Doctor of Philosophy (DPhil) degree under the supervision of Mack Smith. His thesis was completed in 1985 and was titled Fascism's campaign against the mafia.

== Academic career ==
Duggan began his academic career as a junior research fellow at Wolfson College, Oxford between 1983 and 1985. From 1985 to 1990, he was a post-doctoral research fellow at All Souls College, Oxford. During this period, he assisted Mack Smith and Moses Finley with updating their A History of Sicily book; this revised version was published in 1986. His first major work, Fascism and the Mafia, grew out of his DPhil, and was published in Italian in 1986 and in English in 1989. From 1990 to 1997, he retained a link with All Souls College, having been elected a Fifty-Pound Fellow.

In 1987, Duggan joined the University of Reading as a lecturer in history. Unusually for a historian, he was not based in the Department of History but in the Department of European Studies. He taught Italian history, politics, culture and language. In 1994, he was promoted to Reader. In 2002, he was appointed Professor of Modern Italian History. From 2008 to 2013, he was Head of the School of Languages and European Studies (later renamed the School of Literature and Languages). Shortly before his death, Duggan had been appointed to a research professorship in the Department of History, Reading, and had been elected as a Two Year Fellow at All Souls College, Oxford.

Duggan wrote books about Italian history. A Concise History of Italy (1994) allowed him to return to his original interest in medieval history. First published in Italian in 2000, Francesco Crispi 1818–1901 (2002), the first biography in English on Prime Minister Francesco Crispi, explores Crispi's evolution from a revolutionary democrat to a bellicose authoritarian and his role in the unification of Italy. The Force of Destiny: A History of Italy since 1796 (2007) focuses on Italy in the 19th and 20th centuries. In his prize-winning book Fascist Voices (2012), he used the diaries, memoirs and letters of thousands of ordinary Italian citizens to investigate why so many had closely identified with the early 20th-century fascist regime of Benito Mussolini.

== Death ==
Duggan was found dead on 2 November 2015 at his home in Twickenham, London. He was 57 years of age. A memorial service was held in the chapel of All Souls College, Oxford on 12 December. A full inquest into his death recorded a verdict of suicide.

== Personal life ==
Duggan met his wife Jennifer Mundy at the University of Oxford, and they married in 1987. She is an art historian and was the Head of Art Historical Research at the Tate Gallery. They had two children: Amelia and Thomas.

== Honours ==
In 2008, Duggan was appointed a Commendatore dell'Ordine della Stella della Solidarietà Italiana (Commander of the Order of the Star of Italian Solidarity) by the Italian president. This is one of the highest honours Italy can give to a foreign citizen. In 2013, Duggan's book Fascist Voices (2012) was awarded the prestigious Wolfson History Prize. He received £25,000 in prize money. His doctoral supervisor and mentor, Denis Mack Smith, had been awarded the same prize 36 years earlier. Fascist Voices was also named "Political History Book of the Year" in the Political Book Awards of 2013.

== Selected works ==
- Finley, M. I.; Mack Smith, Denis; Duggan, Christopher (1986). A History of Sicily. London: Chatto & Windus. ISBN 978-0701131555.
- Duggan, Christopher (1989). Fascism and the Mafia. New Haven: Yale University Press. ISBN 978-0300043723.
- Duggan, Christopher (1994). A Concise History of Italy (1st ed.). Cambridge: Cambridge University Press. ISBN 978-0521402859.
- Duggan, Christopher; Wagstaff, Christopher, eds. (1995). Italy in the Cold War: Politics, Culture and Society 1948–58. Oxford: Berg. ISBN 978-1859730386.
- Duggan, Christopher (2002). Francesco Crispi, 1818–1901: From Nation to Nationalism. Oxford: Oxford University Press. ISBN 978-0198206118.
- Duggan, Christopher (2007). The Force of Destiny: a History of Italy Since 1796. London: Allen Lane. ISBN 978-0713997095.
- Duggan, Christopher (2012). Fascist Voices: An Intimate History of Mussolini's Italy. London: Bodley Head. ISBN 978-1847921031.
- Duggan, Christopher (2013). A Concise History of Italy (2nd ed.). Cambridge: Cambridge University Press. ISBN 978-0521760393.
- Gundle, Stephen; Duggan, Christopher; Pieri, Giuliana, eds. (2013). The Cult of the Duce: Mussolini and the Italians. Manchester: Manchester University Press. ISBN 978-0719088964.
