= Careston Castle =

Tower house in Angus, Scotland

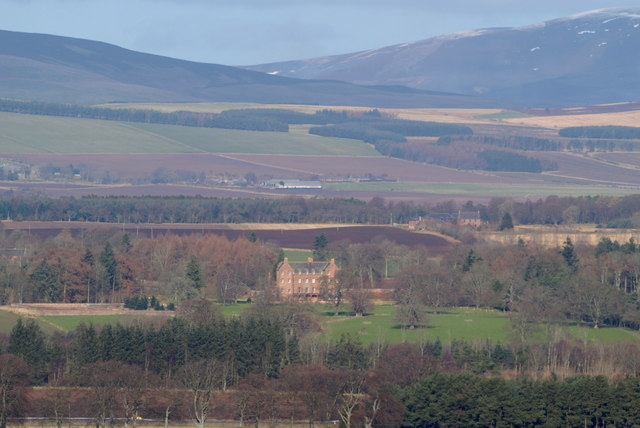
- Careston Castle from the south

Location
- Coordinates: 56.725°N 2.75995°W

Site history
- Built: 16th century

Careston Castle, also known as Caraldston Castle, is an L-plan tower house dating from the 16th century, on a 1,528-acre estate, in Careston parish, Angus, Scotland.

It is a category A listed building.

== History ==
The name is said to derive from Keraldus, dempster to the Earls of Angus at the start of the 13th century.

Nothing remains of an earlier castle. The castle was built about 1582 by Sir Henry Lindsay, who became Earl of Crawford in 1620. It was later owned successively by Sir John Stewart of Grantully, by the Skenes, by a farmer, and in 1871 bought by John Adamson, a mill owner from Blairgowrie and son of a whaling ship owner from Dundee.

The property was listed for sale in October 2021. At that time, a report stated that it had been owned by the Adamson family for 149 years.

== Structure ==
The L-plan tower originally had three vaulted rooms, linked by a corridor in the first floor, although one room now has had its vault removed. There is a large scale-and-platt stair to the first floor, a turnpike stair in the south west jamb, and a private stair on the north.

Careston Castle is notable for its chimney-pieces. The one in the Hall has an enriched cornice, and an overmantel with the Royal Arms of Scotland. There are fine chimney-pieces also in the dining-room, and the central and east bedrooms on the second floor. These chimney-pieces are thought to be derived in form from designs in Jacques Androuet du Cerceau's Second livre (1561). Campbell also argues that Careston incorporates two of du Cerceau's house designs in the formation of its elevation and plan. Two wings of the building have been demolished.

A report in late 2021 stated that the 15,700sq ft castle's principal accommodation consisted of "four fine reception rooms, a library, six main bedrooms and five bathrooms — laid out over the first and second floors". Much of the ground floor was being used for storage and the rooms on the third floor were unused.
