= Lucy Riall =

Irish historian

Lucy Riall is an Irish historian. She was a professor of history at Birkbeck, University of London, and is currently a professor in the Department of History and Civilisation at the European University Institute in Florence.

== Biography ==
Riall studied at the London School of Economics and the University of Cambridge. She was a lecturer in Modern European history at the University of Essex before moving to Birkbeck. Since 2004 she has been editor of the journal European History Quarterly.

Among her awards are a visiting professorship at the Ecole Normale Superieure in Paris and a senior fellowship at the University of Freiburg's Institute of Advanced Study.

One of the leading experts on modern Italy, Riall has written on nineteenth-century state-formation and nationalism in Italy and Sicily. Several of her books treat the history of the Risorgimento; Garibaldi: Invention of a Hero (2007) examined the popular cult of Giuseppe Garibaldi as a global cultural phenomenon.

Riall speaks fluent Italian and she appears frequently on Italian TV and radio (RAI) as well as on the BBC.

== Works ==
- The Italian Risorgimento: State, Society, and National Unification, Routledge, 1994.
- Sicily and the Unification of Italy: Liberal Policy and Local Power, 1859-1866, Oxford University Press, 1998.
- (ed. with David Laven) Napoleon's Legacy: Problems of Government in Restoration Europe, Berg, 2000.
- Garibaldi: Invention of a Hero, Yale University Press, 2007 (Italian translation, Laterza, 2007).
- Risorgimento: The History of Italy from Napoleon to Nation State, Palgrave Macmillan, 2009 (Italian translation, Donzelli 2009).
- "Martyr Cults in Nineteenth-Century Italy," The Journal of Modern History Vol. 82, No. 2, June 2010.
- Under the Volcano: Revolution in a Sicilian Town, Oxford University Press, 2013.
