= Socialism in Argentina =

Socialism in Argentina has taken many different shapes throughout Argentina's history. Many of the country's leaders have had a socialist ideology as their political framework within Argentina and more broadly, throughout Latin America. As a result of this history, on the international podium they are recognised for their socialist history and leadership. Argentina's alignment with socialist ideology particularly during the Peronist years has further contributed to this global sentiment. Although the history of Socialism in Argentina can be traced to specific dates, it is important to view the role it has played as part to the influence of international phenomenon such as World War I, World War II and The Malvinas War. Today, Socialism in Argentina is visible in the contemporary administrations of Néstor Kirchner and his wife and later president Cristina Fernandez de Kirchner.

== History ==
=== Early history: 1840–1915 ===
Early socialist thought, began with the ideals of Esteban Echeverria in the early 19th Century, who led the May Association, a political group which opposed the then current dictator Juan Manuel de Rosas. Echeverria's ideals of socialism then were premised on the idea of equal rights to eradicate poverty. He wrote many works significant for the movement, including "El Dogma Socialista" (The Socialist Dogma) and would influence the coming generations socialist thought. Although Echeverria's work was significant for the movement, the starting point of Socialism in Argentina is considered to be a little later and in the hands of Echeverria's contemporaries.

The ignition of Socialism in Argentina had many significant socialist thinkers such as Juan B. Justo and Nicolas Repetto. Although this thought existed, Socialism in Argentina started in the 1890s with the formation of the 'Socialist Party" in 1896. The party was formed on the basis that there was a greater need for 'social focus'. The leader of this group, Juan B. Justo saw this absence and with Nicolas Repetto they led the party. In 1904, Alfredo Palacios a member of the Socialist party was to become the first socialist deputy in Argentina.

=== 1916–1930 ===
Argentina during WWI didn't experience the same hardships as other Latin American nations, in part due to their leadership by President Hipólito Yrigoyen. This hallmark election ended the period of conservative powers holding power. After WWI, there was a large anarchist movement in which many emigrants from Europe arrived in Argentina. This arrival of immigrants catalysed a new brand of left-wing activism. In particular, there was a rejection of the previous Socialist way in which Argentina was run, and a movement towards anarchism. This period brought much unrest, and conflict surrounding what ideology would best frame the nation of Argentina. Acts of violence such as the attempted assassination of U.S. President Herbert Hoover in 1928.

In 1922 with the rise of The Argentina Right, the works of Marcelino Menendez played a large role in influencing their philosophies and ideas. Also in this year, the famous speech titles "the time of the sword" was delivered to future dictator Agustin P. Justo. The main premise of the speech was its call for a coup d'état and the replacement of the political system with military dictatorship.

=== 1930–1943 ===
This era known as the "infamous decade" has attracted great attention for its ideological, social and political dimensions. The military coup in 1930 forced Hipólito Yrigoyen from presidency, and emplaced José Félix Uriburu. After gaining presidency, Uriburu made efforts to institute reform through incorporating corporatism to the Argentina Constitution, which was seen as a move towards fascism. This move split alliances, and resulted in support shifting towards Agustin P. Justo. Justo took a different political stance, starting a policy of liberal economic moves that primarily benefitted the nation's upper classes and permitted great political and industrial corruption at the expense of national growth. One of the most infamous decisions of Justo's government was the creation of the Roca–Runciman Treaty between Argentina and the United Kingdom, which benefitted the British economy and the rich beef producers of Argentina. This was a decade of great unrest, and conflicting political, philosophical and social ideology.

=== 1946–1970 ===
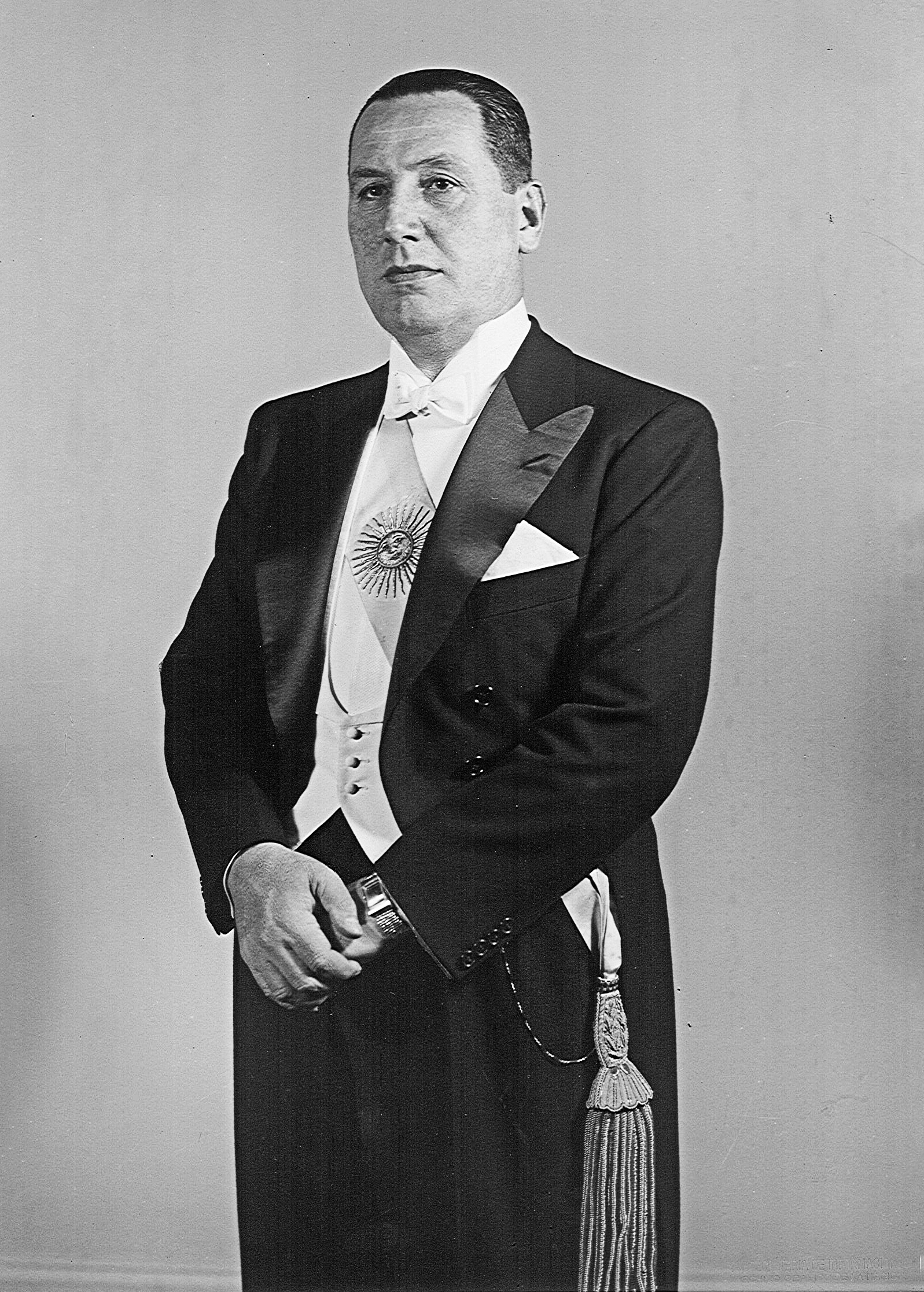
Juan Perón

During the Post World War-II world Socialism in Argentina was largely informed by the brand of socialism that newly elected president Juan Domingo Perón would institute. Perón's ideology and policies represented what Federico Finchelstein considered "the synthesis of nationalism and non-Marxist Christian socialism". Peronism was variously described as a variant of nationalist socialism, paternalistic socialism, non-Marxist socialism, and Catholic socialism. Marxist revolutionary Che Guevara considered Peronism "a kind of indigenous Latin American socialism with which the Cuban Revolution could side". Charles D. Ameringer argued that "the rise to power of Juan Perón in 1943 was not the end of the socialist impulse in Argentina; it was the culmination" and added that "much of the social legislation either introduced or implemented by Perón . . . originated with the Socialist Party."

Perón created a planned and heavily regulated economy, with "a massive public sector of nationalized industries and social services" that was "redistributive in nature" and prioritized workers' benefits and the empowerment of trade unions. He implemented far-reaching social policies that benefitted the Argentine working class, such as a broad public health and education systems and institutionalization of rights of the workers and peasants. Peronism resulted in am emergence of class consciousness of Argentina workers. Peronism greatly empowered trade unions and integrated them into state power, which along with the nationalization of numerous industries and price controls on rents, energy, public services and food items allowed Argentina workers to "have the highest standard of living of their class worldwide."

By the time Perón was overthrown in 1955, real wages increased by 60% in comparison to 1945, and workers' wages rose to 50% of the Argentine GDP. Perón also shortened the working day, enforced paid annual holidays and Sunday rest laws, implemented pension schemes and layoff protections, as well as accident compensation, and state-enforced conciliation and arbitration procedures that greatly favoured the trade unions and disadvantaged the employers. Under Perón, the unionization of Argentine workers reached 42% - a record for Latin America; additionally, Perón introduced regional constitutions under which half of the legislature was to be composed of trade union representatives. Donald C. Hodges wrote that Peronism represented a "socialism of the non-Marxist variety" and sought to move away from the prevalence of the capitalist relations of production.

In 1955 Socialism in Argentina would then take a different form with the ousting of Peron by military coup. However, the economic upheaval caused by the Socialist reform of Peron prevented the economic growth experienced throughout most of the world during the 1950s and ‘60s. The Government continued to implement Peronist socialism to little effect. Immense debt amongst the continued economic decline followed in the wake of Perons’ socialist reforms, and inflation continued to grow. This unease grew to a boiling point in the 1970s, with a communist uprising. Socialism however, would change drastically in its effect and institution during this period.

=== 1970–1983 ===
The anti communist sentiments of the Cold War had vast implications on Socialism in Argentina in the form of Operation Condor. To be a socialist in Argentina, and in Latin America more broadly, was very dangerous. The regime's sentiment to combat the growing communist ideology in Latin America was dealt with the infamous disappearances. The initiative was employed to target those who were proponents of socialist or marxist thought, and with Argentina's history with the ideology this saw the number of missing or killed people total 30 000. In this way, many people were branded with the title ‘socialist’, and even vague evidence could see the victims' ‘disappearance.’ Particularly the politically active were targeted, students, writers and Peronist guerillas. This period of state terrorism changed how Argentines viewed socialism, and in many ways subdued the movement. This period is also considered one of the most infamous in regards to Socialism in Argentina and for many people is what comes to mind upon hearing about the ideology. More recently this era has had much attention drawn to it. The modern developments in the forms of trials and declassification of documents have brought to the forefront the movement for Socialism in Argentina and its correspondent retaliations. The amalgamation of the Popular socialist party and the Argentine socialist party in 1972 marked a significant moment historically for the parties. In 1989 the party would win the majority in Rosario.

=== 1983–2000 ===
Socialism in Argentina changed with the election of Carlos Menem in 1989. The role of the state would drastically change, with extensive structural reform. Menem was a Peronist, and employed methods of privatisation as a means to reduce hyperinflation.

=== Present day ===
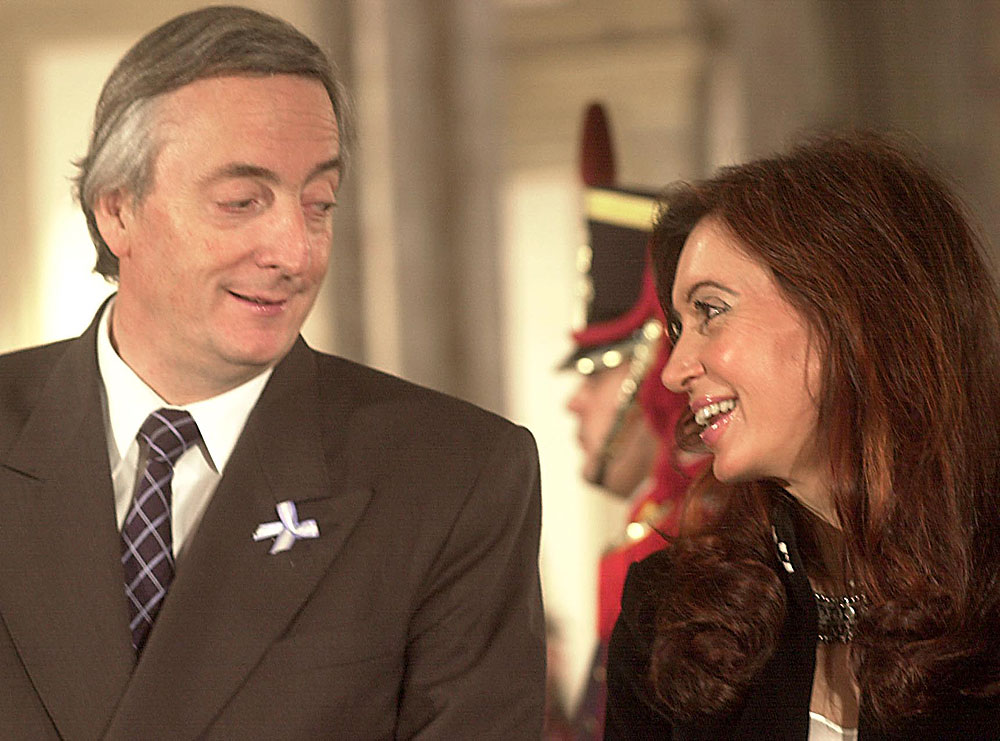
Néstor Kirchner and Cristina Fernández de Kirchner

Both the role and history of socialism in Argentina have played a significant role in forming the identity of the nation in the world. As seen, the changing historical backdrop has influenced the current of the movement. Particularly, the recent Kirchner leaderships have informed the movement for socialism visible today in Argentina in many ways. The Nestor Kirchner leadership, invoked a brand of socialism that saw his implementation of price controls and nationalisation of private assets. Kirchner further worked to restructure the public debt problem of Argentina. In many ways, he continued the ideological legacy of Peron, and similarly to Peron's demise was met with Argentina default in 2014. Former president Mauricio Macri has recently employed similar Peronist-style policies to reduce the problem of inflation. Namely, price controls on over 60 items including rice and milk. Argentina's ideological landscape is beginning to change, with Macri's election there are still some prominent Peronist practises remaining. However, as a whole the populist movement in Argentina can be seen as diminishing, and perhaps a shift away from socialist tendencies.

== Key figures in the movement ==
Socialism in Argentina has bared many key players both on the thought and in its practise. These figures have stood for socio-political change through pursuits of politics, literature, art and other forms of expression.

Ernesto ‘Che’ Guevara was influential on Socialism in Argentina in his advocacy of Marxist thought. In many ways, Ernesto 'Che' Guevara has popularised the worlds understanding of Argentina socialist thought, through his memoirs and the later produced film, The Motorcycle Diaries. In many ways, Guevara has become a figure head for social movements in Argentina, and more broadly around the world, spreading his beliefs in a more equal political system.

=== Modern impacts ===
Socialism in Argentina has taken many different forms with a changing socio-political landscape, and changing leaders. The movement started as a desire for greater ‘social focus’ but has since grown to embody a more extensive set of methods and practise. The Peron leadership has in many ways informed Argentina's socialist identity. On the contrary, the antithesis to this movement, Operation Condor instituted a rigorous regime which juxtaposed that political environment with a reinforced brand of neoliberalism. The extensive, and far reaching scholarly material on the subject underscores the significance of the movement.

== See also ==
- Patagonia Rebelde
- FaSinPat
