= Peronism =

Argentine political movement

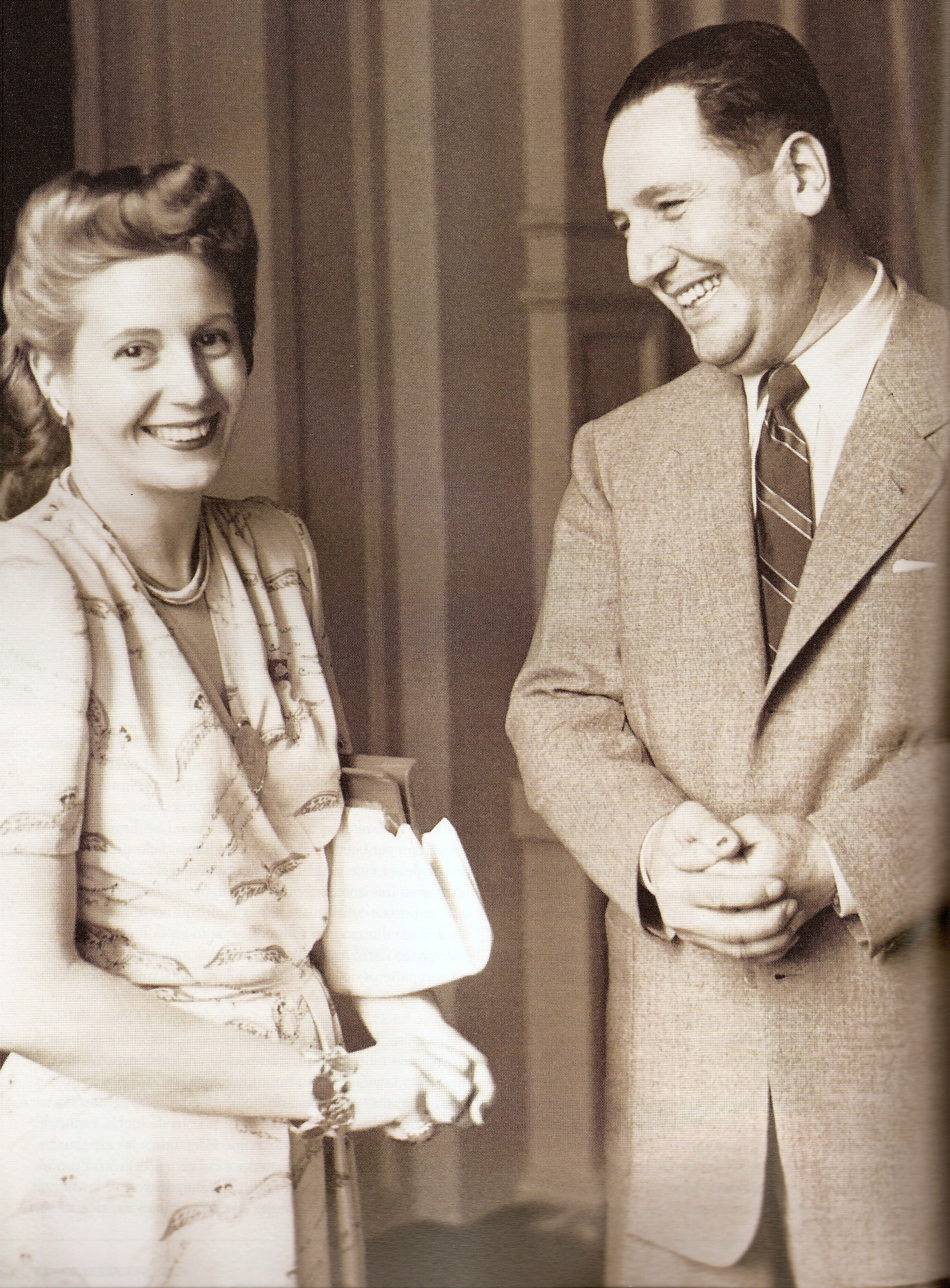
Argentine president Juan Perón and first lady Eva Perón have been the central figures in the Justicialist Party.

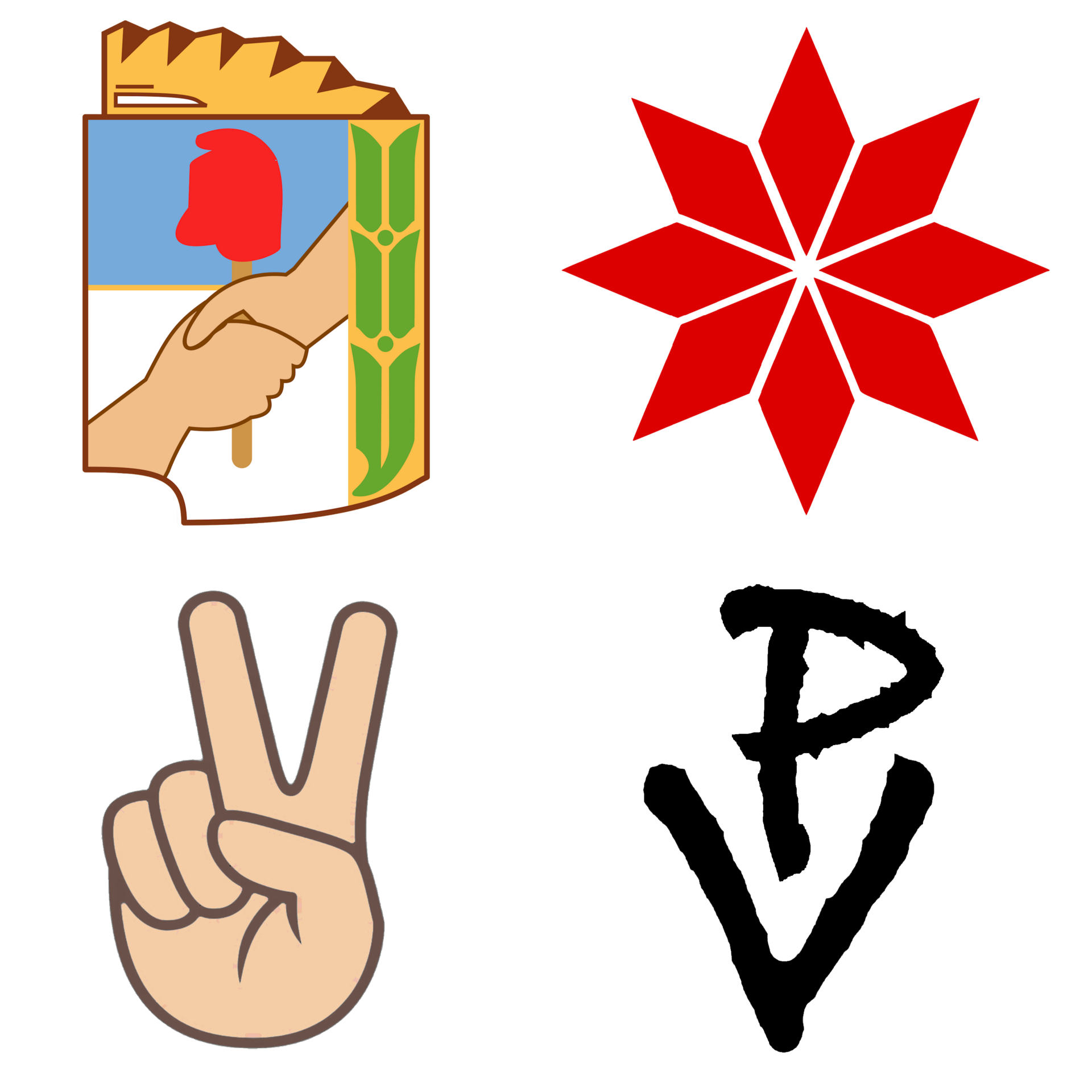
(Clockwise from the top left) Symbols associated with Peronism: Peronist Party emblem, the federal star, the "Perón vuelve" (Perón returns) sign, and the "V" hand sign.

Peronism, (Note: /pəˈroʊnɪzəm/; Spanish: peronismo) also known as justicialism, (Note: Spanish: justicialismo. The Justicialist Party is the main Peronist party in Argentina, and derives its name from the concept of social justice.) is an Argentine ideology and political movement, based on the ideas, doctrine, and legacy of Juan Perón (1895–1974). It has been an influential movement in 20th- and 21st-century Argentine politics. Since 1946, Peronists have won 10 out of the 14 presidential elections in which they have been allowed to run. Peronism is defined through its three flags: "social justice" (the fight against social and economic inequalities), "economic independence" (an economy that does not depend on other countries, by developing its national industry), and "political sovereignty" (the non-interference of foreign powers in domestic affairs).

Peronism, as an ideology, is described as a social form of nationalism, as it promotes a sense of national pride among Argentines. However, it promotes an inclusive form of state-nationalism that embraces all ethnicities and races as integral parts of the nation, distinguishing it from racial or chauvinistic ethno-nationalism that prioritizes a single ethnic group. This is due to the ethnically heterogeneous background of Argentina, which is a result of the mixing between indigenous peoples, Criollos, various immigrant groups, and their descendants. Likewise, Peronism is generally considered populist, as it relies on the figure of a leader (originally embodied by Perón) to lead the masses. Consequently, it adopted a third position in the context of the Cold War, as expressed in the phrase: "we are neither Yankees nor Marxists."

Peronism has taken both progressive and paternalistic conservative measures. Among its conservative elements, which were later abandoned, are anti-communist sentiments, a strong sense of patriotism, a militarist approach and the adoption of a law on Catholic teaching in public schools; its progressive measures include the expansion of workers' rights, the adoption of women's suffrage, free tuition for public universities, and a failed attempt to sanction the divorce law after the breakdown of relations with the church. Peronism granted the working class a genuine role in government and enacted reforms that eroded the power of the Argentine oligarchy. Peronist reforms also included a constitutional right to housing, ending the oppression of indigenous peoples, adding mandatory trade union representation to regional legislatures, freezing retail prices, and subsidizing foodstuffs for workers.

Perón followed what he called a "national form of socialism", which represented the interests of different sectors of Argentine society, and grouped them into multiple organizations: workers were represented by the CGT, Peronist businessmen in the General Economic Confederation, landowners by the Argentine Agrarian Federation, women by the Female Peronist Party, Jews in the Argentine Israelite Organization, students in the Secondary Student Union. Perón was able to coordinate and centralize the working class, which he mobilized to act on his behest. Trade unions have been incorporated into Peronism's structure and remain a key part of the movement today. Additionally, the state intervened in labor-capital conflicts in favor of labor, with the Ministry of Labour and Social Security responsible for directly negotiating and enforcing agreements.

Perón became Argentina's labour secretary after participating in the 1943 military coup and was elected president of Argentina in 1946. He introduced social programs that benefited the working class, supported labor unions, and called for increased state involvement in the economy. In addition, he supported industrialists to facilitate harmony between labor and capital. Perón was very popular due to his leadership and gained even more admiration through his wife, Eva, who championed the rights of migrant workers, the poor, and women, playing a crucial role in securing women's suffrage, until her death from cancer in 1952. Due to economic problems and political repression, the military overthrew Perón and banned the Justicialist Party in 1955. It was not until 1973 that open elections were held again, in which Perón was re-elected president with 62% of the vote. Perón died in the following year, opening the way for his widow and vice president, Isabel, to succeed him in the presidency. During the Peronists' second period in office from 1973 to 1976, various social provisions were improved.

Perón's death left an intense power vacuum, and the military promptly overthrew Isabel in 1976. Since the return to democracy in 1983, Peronist candidates have won several general elections. The candidate for Peronism, Carlos Menem, was elected in 1989 and served for two consecutive terms until 1999. Menem abandoned the traditional Peronist policies, focusing on the adoption of free-market policies, the privatization of state enterprises, and pro-US foreign policy. In 1999, Fernando De La Rúa would win the presidential elections allied with a large sector of Peronists who denounced Menem. After the De La Rúa administration collapsed in 2001, four interim Peronist leaders took over between 2001 and 2003 due to the political turmoil of the Argentine Great Depression. After coming to power in the 2003 Argentine general election, Néstor Kirchner restructured the Justicialist platform and returned to the classical left-wing populism of Perón, reverting the movement's detour to free-market capitalism under Carlos Menem. Kirchner served for only one term, while his wife, Cristina Fernández de Kirchner, served two (having been elected in 2007 and re-elected in 2011). From 2019 to 2023, Cristina Fernández de Kirchner was vice president, and Alberto Fernández was president. As of 2025, Peronists have held the presidency in Argentina for a total of 39 years.

== Overview ==
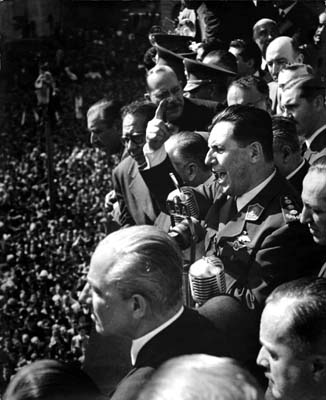
President Juan Perón giving a speech

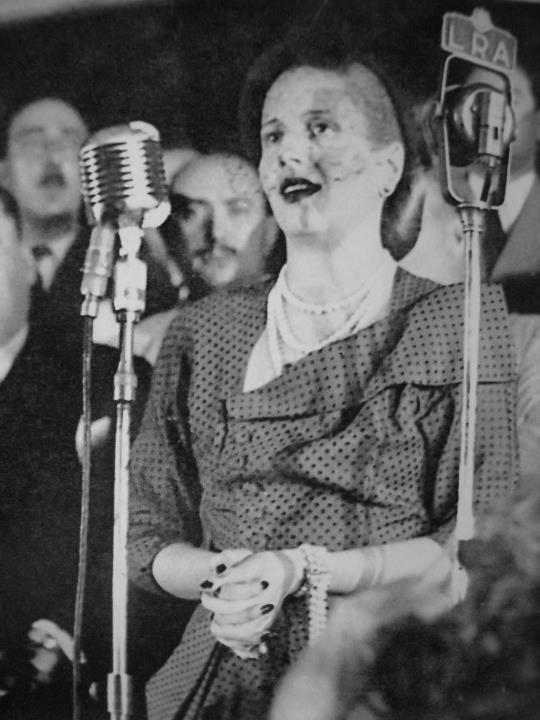
Eva Perón claims the female vote in 1947

=== Classification ===
Peronism is generally considered to be a variant of left-wing populism or a broadly left-wing ideology. Antonio Gansley-Ortiz wrote that "Peronism is universally agreed upon to be a left wing populism"; according to Jay Park, "it is generally accepted that Peronism is left-of-center". Park clarified that while it has factions, such as Kirchnerism which is seen as a "leftist splinter", Peronism is "by all accounts left-of-center to begin with". At the same time, political scientist Anthony W. Pereira noted that left-wing populists such as Perón "may share important elements with their right-wing counterparts." Carlos de la Torre and Oscar Mazzoleni also stressed this ambiguity, arguing that the main difference between left-wing and right-wing populisms is the economic focus of the former and social focus of the latter. Political scientist Pierre Ostiguy argues that it is "structural and intuitive" to classify Peronism as left-leaning, especially given its electoral base and dependency on trade unions. He added that "Perón could absolutely not, as the ordinary working class well understood, be considered on the right. He thus shared a position with the leftist political parties, in the opposite camp." Ostiguy defined Peronism as "a brand of populism that sought to deny elites' and capitalism's power, empower working class constituents, and help the politically and economically oppressed." Writing on the debate regarding Peronism and its political position, the University of New York professor of political science Peter Ranis wrote:

[Some] would like to tear Peronism bodily from the leftist tradition rather than accept its role as a populist alliance that includes labor support and leftist propositions on a number of social, economic, and foreign policy issues, positions that often coincide with those of traditional Marxist-Leninist political parties. The difference is that with Peronism the workers must share influence with other socioeconomic groups, but this distinction does not exclude Peronism from the tradition of mass movements of the progressive left. I would be the last to deny the gulf between Peronism and Argentine Marxism-Leninism, but to deny Peronism as a genuinely socialist form of populism is to ignore the great Argentine debate on the left among all those sectors from Peron's exile up to the present.

However, some described Peronism as a Latin American form of fascism instead. Some also described Peronism as fascist and socialist at the same time, or simultaneously "syndicalist, socialist, nationalist and fascist." Criticizing identifying Peronism as right-wing or fascist, Robert D. Crassweller remarked: "A movement whose founder spends his life combating the economic and social elite, whose great contribution was to bring the anonymous masses into the political and economic mainstream, and whose lifelong electoral base was principally organized labor, can hardly be deemed rightist." Beyond Perón, the Peronist movement itself has many factions - Kirchnerism and revolutionary Peronism on the left, and Federal Peronism and Orthodox Peronism on the right. The Justicialist Party created by Perón is placed on the left of the political spectrum.

Peronism is described as socialist by many political scientists, classified as a variant of nationalist socialism, populist socialism, paternalistic socialism, non-Marxist socialism, and Catholic socialism. Political scientists supporting this view note that Perón created a planned and heavily regulated economy, with "a massive public sector of nationalized industries and social services" that was "redistributive in nature" and prioritized workers' benefits and empowering trade unions. Perón's close relationship with a socialist leader Juan José Arévalo and his extensive support for the Bolivian National Revolution are also considered arguments in favor of this view. Additionally, despite promoting a concept of a "Third Way" between the 'imperialisms' of the United States and Soviet Union, Perón supported and became a close ally of the Cuban Revolution, Salvador Allende of Chile, and the People's Republic of China. It is also noted that the Marxist revolutionary Che Guevara, despite being born in an anti-Peronist family, considered Peronism "a kind of indigenous Latin American socialism with which the Cuban Revolution could side". Perónist thought is considered a genuine socialist ideology by some Marxist writers such as Samir Amin, José María Aricó, Dieter Boris, and Donald C. Hodges.

Writing on the historical and political debates on the ideological nature of Peronism, Czech political scientists Pavlína Springerová and Jiří Chalupa stressed the dominance of the view that Peronism was a variant of socialism: "Historians and political scientists over time defined Peronism as Christian socialism, national socialism, demagogic dictatorship, plebiscitary presidential system, state socialism, non-Marxist collectivism, worker democracy or national capitalism". Some historians also consider Peronism to be a variant of Nasserism, which defines it as an ideology based on "middle-class military men who would utilize the armed forces to forge a socialist transformation of society." Mariano Mestman wrote that "Peronism was proposing a type of Socialism at times called 'national', different from that postulated by the classical Marxist left but no less revolutionary".

There are also alternative evaluations of Peronism that go beyond the most common labels for Peronism such as socialism, fascism, or arguments that Peronism transcends the left-right divide. Some scholars evaluated Peronism as a social democratic ideology instead, or even paternalistic conservatism, with a mixture of militant labourism and traditional conservatism. However, whether Peronism was conservative is heavily disputed, as the proponents of Peronism see it as socially progressive. Peronism has also been described as socially progressive by some political analysts, as well as by historians such as Luis Alberto Romero. The main Peronist party is the Justicialist Party, whose policies have significantly varied over time and across government administrations, but have generally been described as "a vague blend of nationalism and labourism", or populism. Alan Knight argues that Peronism is similar to Bolivarian Revolution and the Mexican Revolution in terms of consequences and ideology, noting that while Peronism was "socially progressive, but politically ambiguous", it brought the Argentinian working class significant material benefits as well as political empowerment and social inclusion. Ultimately, Knight recommends the term "revolutionary populism" for Peronism.

=== Self-description ===
Perón himself described his ideology and his movement as left-wing, writing in September 1973: "Peronism is a left-wing movement. But the left that we advocate is a Justicialist left above all things; it is not a communist or anarchist left. It is a Justicialist left that wants to achieve a community where each Argentine can flourish." Perón named Christian socialism, Franklin D. Roosevelt and Harold Laski his main political inspirations. He argued that his main goal was to implement and declare "economic independence" of Argentina, which he sought to achieve by nationalization of Argentinian resources, state control of the economy, curtailing multinational and foreign companies, redistribution of wealth, asserting the "power of the working class", and abolishing elitist and "antinational" capitalism. By 1973, the slogan adopted by Perón became "dependency or liberation". In July 1971, he argued that his ideology of justicialism is socialist:

For us Justicialist Government is that which serves the people . . . our revolutionary process articulates individual and collective [needs], it is one form of socialism. Therefore a fair socialism, like the one Justicialism wants, and that is why it is called Justicialism, is that in which a community develops in agreement with [the community's] intrinsic conditions.

Speaking of the origin of the term he used to describe his ideology, justicialism, Perón wrote:

Socialism, which was specific to our ideology, was greatly discredited in our country. The parties that called themselves ‘socialist’ had, in recent years, been the favourite ‘allies’ of the oligarchy in the traditional politics of our land. The working classes, understandably, distrusted them. They had seen them validating all the ‘trickery’ of recent governments, with their presence in parliaments and their permanent support for the supposed “legality” of the oligarchic regime. Needless to say, with their ‘battle horse’ of ‘atheism’, they had earned the enmity of the Church.

It was not, even remotely, the right name. Someone in our working group suggested the following: since our fundamental idea was social justice, and since we could not use the derivative of “social” for socialism, we should take the derivative of justice, justicialism. We thought it was brilliant. And so it remained. Since then, that is what we have called it. In reality, it is our own form of ‘creole’ socialism.

In a 1953 letter to his friend and President of Chile Carlos Ibáñez del Campo, Perón expressed his philosophy:

Give the people, especially the workers, everything you can. When it seems you are giving them too much, give them even more. You will see results. Everyone will try to scare you with the threat of economic collapse, but this is all a lie. There is nothing more elastic than the economy, which everyone fears so much because they do not understand it.

A decade later, in 1967, Perón similarly wrote:

There is no free economy. It is run by the state or by international financial consortiums.

However, despite Perón's declarations, the movement itself was split into left-wing and right-wing factions, vying for supremacy within the movement. While all Peronists claimed to adhere to the ideas of Perón, their interpretation of Perón's intentions varied greatly. Left-wing Peronists believed that the goal of Perón was to establish "the socialist nation", while right-wing Peronists argued that his vision is more similar to corporatism than socialism, and sought to establish an "organized community". Perón himself used very vague terms such as socialismo nacional ("national socialism"), which he described as being based on Christian social values and aiming to overthrow the "imperialist slavery" of Argentina. Here, Perón argued that his version of socialism was not Marxist but Christian, and that it was a "national variant of socialism", and that it differed from capitalism on the basis of being a "just social order". While seemingly favoring the left-wing Peronism, Perón's "national socialism" was interpreted in very diverse ways, including being conflated with Nazism by fringe groups of far-right Peronists. The commonly accepted interpretation however, is that Perón meant "a 'national' road to socialism, understood as a system of economic socialization and popular power respectful of specific national conditions and traditions."

Perón consistently identified with socialist figures - he praised Che Guevara, and spoke sympathetically of Mao Zedong as "this little Chinese man who steals my ideas." He described Peronism as a national form of socialism that was to end the capitalist exploitation of Argentina and fight imperialism. Perón expressed deep affinity to Maoism, writing: "The refusal of Mao to side with colonialism lays the foundation of the 'Third World' in which the different socialist democracies can get along perfectly. There is no reason for nationalism and socialism to quarrel. Both can unite with the common objective of liberating the pueblos." Perón additionally stated that "Marxism is not only not in contradiction with the Peronist Movement, but complements it."; he excused his initially anti-communist rhetoric as opposition to the Argentine "communist orthodoxy" that opposed him, which he considered to be "on the side of the oligarchy or Braden's arm".

=== Development ===
Peronism gained popularity in Argentina after the failure of the preceding government to listen and recognize the needs of its middle class. The previous president Hipólito Yrigoyen neglected the workers' pleas for better wages and working conditions after World War I. Yrigoyen was notorious for failing to oppose Argentina's oligarchy. According to Teresa Meade in A History of Modern Latin America: 1800 to the Present, Yrigoyen failed "to establish a middle-class-based political system from 1916 to 1930 – mainly because his Radical Civic Union had neither the will nor the means to effectively oppose the dominance of the oligarchy".

While previous governments maintained the power structure, Perón, originally a military officer, used his experiences in Europe and political charisma to advocate for a new political order to better the lives of ordinary Argentines. Unlike Yrigoyen, Perón "recognized that the industrial working class was not necessarily an impediment, and could be mobilized to serve as the basis for building a corporatist state that joined the interests of labor with those of at least a large section of the national bourgeoisie to promote a nationalist agenda".

Perón was yet unknown to the general public in the 1930s, but he was highly respected in the Argentinian army; he served as a military attaché between 1938 and 1940, and quickly gained a prestigious political position following the 1943 Argentine coup d'état. He took over the Labor Department in October 1943 and started cementing his reputation as the ally of the Argentinian trade unions, describing himself as a "labor unionist" (sindicalista) in an interview with a Chilean journalist. In November 1943, the national labour department was replaced by a new department for labour and welfare, which gave Perón enormous power over the economy. Perón presented himself as a Catholic laborist committed to the ideals of "harmony" and "distributive justice". His first political triumph came with the settlement with Unión Ferroviaria in December 1943, Argentina's largest railroad union. Perón "offered the union almost everything it had been seeking, until now in vain, during the past fifteen years", which gave him the reputation of "Argentina's Number One Worker" amongst railroad unionists.

In January 1944, General Pedro Pablo Ramírez fell from power following the revelation of secret negotiations between Nazi Germany and Argentinian junta. The junta was forced to break diplomatic relations with the Axis and purge its cabinet of pro-Axis members. Ramírez was replaced by moderate Edelmiro Julián Farrell, which prompted protests from nationalist circles – in Tucumán, flags on government buildings flew at half-mast in sign of protest. Perón further expanded his power, as he took over the ministry of war that Farrell commanded before becoming president. In March 1944, railroad workers organized a demonstration in support of Perón, and in June, he was able to take control over metalworkers' union Unión Obrera Metalúrgica. Perón's speech from 11 June introduced the concept of "nation in arms", where he called war an inevitable consequence of human condition. According to Perón, a nation could win a war only if it would "develop true . . . solidarity [and] create a strong sense of discipline and personal responsibility in the people." The speech was commonly cited by domestic and international opponents of Perón, who accused him of fascist sympathies. The junta suffered a massive decline in prestige in August 1944, as the liberation of Paris sparked massive pro-Allied demonstrations in Argentina, in which the protesters called for the resignation of the junta for its Nazi sympathies.

Perón would sharply reconfigure his views and speeches in late 1944, as the nationalist junta was facing intense pressure to reform and hold elections. He declared that his ultimate goal is to introduce "true democracy" in Argentina, and began searching for allies amongst the middle and upper classes. However, as he was rejected by the Radical circles, Perón committed himself to developing his popularity amongst the working class. Historian David Rock remarked that "Perón again found himself forced back on the support of the unions alone and at this point openly embraced democratic socialism." He praised the victory of the Labour Party in the 1945 United Kingdom general election, portraying it as proof of "humanity marching toward a new world" and urged Argentinian workers "to defend their rights for themselves if these rights were not to be taken away by their enemies." Perón also embraced the hitherto derogatory connotation of his supporters as "shirtless" (descamisado), which became a metaphor for poor and destitute worker that Peronism would lead towards a "national liberation".

Using the term justicalismo to describe his ideology, Perón propagated it as socialismo nacional cristiano – "Christian national socialism", an unclear term that he used to discuss diverse government systems that in his belief corresponded to the will of the people while also considering the unique circumstances and culture of each nation. According to Richard Gillespie, this expression meant to convey "a 'national' road to socialism, understood as a system of economic socialization and popular power respectful of specific national conditions and traditions." In 1967, Perón defended his notion of 'national socialism' by arguing that "nationalism need not be at odds with socialism", given that "both, in the end, far from being antagonistic, can be united with a common goal of liberation of peoples and men". In the September 1972 meeting of left-wing Peronist groups, Peronism was described as "the national expression of socialism, insofar as it represents, expresses and develops in action the aspirations of the popular masses and the Argentine working class". Peronism was regarded as a form of autochthonous socialism that was to grant "political and economic emancipation" to the workers of Argentina. However, whether Peronism constituted a genuine socialist movement of non-Marxist nature is unclear. John J. Johnson and Kalman H. Silvert linked Peronism to Argentinian reactionary nationalism and concluded that it is a fascist movement, whereas Juan José Hernández Arregui and Jorge Abelardo Ramos considered Peronism a variant of left-wing nationalism or a "revolutionary, anti-imperialist, nationalist movement". Jorge Castañeda Gutman describes Peronism as a national populist movement that "undoubtedly belongs on the left of the political spectrum."

=== Other assessments ===
Peronism was a broad movement that encompassed several ideologies and concepts. Argentinian historian Cristian Buchrucker described it as a mixture of nationalist, populist and Christian socialist elements, while Humberto Cucchetti stated that Peronism was an accumulation of many political concepts such as "nationalist socialism, trade unionist tradition, nationalisation of the middle strata, charismatic leadership, revolutionary prophetism, Third Worldism, justicialist ethics, Christian utopia, popular mobilisation and outlines of democratisation". While the movement was in the state of constant struggle between competing ideological movements between it, it never abandoned trade unions and its "revolutionary rhetoric that claimed to assume directly the features of a nationalist liberation movement".

The Economist has called Peronism "an alliance between trade unions and the 'caudilloss' of the backward north".

In 2004, Chilean senator Ignacio Walker has criticized Peronism as having "fascistoid", "authoritarian" and "corporative" traits and a "perverse logic" considering this "the real wall between Chile and Argentina" and "not the Andes". However, in 2013, he wrote that " Aprismo had various counterparts within the heterogeneous Latin American left", listing the historical Revolutionary Nationalist Movement, Institutional Revolutionary Party, Chilean Socialist Party, Varguism and Peronism as examples.

Defenders of Peronism also describe the doctrine as populist, albeit in the sense that they believe it embodies the interests of the masses and in particular the most vulnerable social strata. Admirers hold Perón in esteem for his administration's anti-imperialism and non-alignment as well as its socially progressive initiatives.

Ronaldo Munck noted that "many observers even saw Perón himself as some kind of nationalist, socialist leader, if not as Argentina's Lenin." While cautioning against idealistic interpretations of Peronism, Munck argues that ultimately Perón did not differ from Tendencia Revolucionaria in terms of economic ideology, but rather mass mobilisation, writing: "The purely anti-imperialist and anti-oligarchic political programme of the Montoneros ("national socialism") was not incompatible with Peron's economic project of "national reconstruction", but their power of mass mobilisation was." Writing on Peronism, Ernesto Laclau maintained that "a socialist populism is not the most backward form of working class ideology but the most advanced - the moment when the working class has succeeded in condensing the ensemble of democratic ideology in a determinate social formation within its own ideology".

In his political science book Political Man: The Social Bases of Politics, Seymour Martin Lipset argued that the most distinguishable aspect of Peronism is that it is oriented towards trade unions, workers and class struggle, writing that "Peronism, much like Marxist parties, has been oriented toward the poorer classes, primarily urban workers but also the more impoverished rural population." He characterized Peronism as an ideology best described as "anticapitalist populist nationalism which appeals to the lower strata". Lipset also took note of a view that Peronism is a fascist movement, but argued that Peronism can only be seen as a left-wing equivalent of fascism: "If Peronism is considered a variant of fascism, then it is a fascism of the left because it is based on the social strata who would otherwise turn to socialism or Communism as an outlet for their frustrations." Lipset concluded that Peronism should be seen as a "form of "left" extremism".

In context of political dichotomy of Argentina, historian Daniel James argues that "Peronism within the Peron/anti-Peron dichotomy that dominated the political and social context was per se leftist, anti-establishment and revolutionary". Similarly, James P. Brennan claims that as a movement, Peronism is ultimately a left-wing coalition that appeals to "national popular" tradition, writing that "this hemisphere of the political spectrum would support the statement that Peronism is a forerunner of social democracy." According to political scientist Torcuato di Tella, Peronism occupies the same place as left-wing political parties in Europe. Comparing Argentinian politics to Italian one, he writes:

This comparison between the Italian and the Argentine party structures assumes a certain equivalence between the Radical party and the Christian Democratic cum Socialist alliance. On the other side of the main conflict line, the Peronists would occupy a position akin to that of the Communists.

==== Socialist assessments ====
In 1946. following the introduction of Perón's new Labour Party, a coalition was formed as an opposition, which included the socialist parties of Argentina among a broad range of other parties and groups. The 1946 opposition to Perón included a broad front of conservatives, radicals, liberals, and socialists. Nevertheless, some Argentine left-wing groups criticized the participation of socialists in anti-Peronist opposition. Workers' Front (Spanish: Frente Obrero) denounced the anti-Peronist camp as "the mobilization of students, bourgeois, and perfumed ladies", noting that those who oppose Perón must also "judge the general strike of 17 and 18 October as an aberration". Historian Juan Eugenio Corradi argued that the socialists who opposed Perón were reformist and shared material interests with the Argentine bourgeoisie, with which it was allied:

The undisputed economic hegemony of the landed elite throughout this period of middle-class government is even more clearly revealed by the vicissitudes of the Argentine socialist movement. That movement was born in the 1880's when inflation devoured the incomes of the incipient working class. With the subsequent expansion of Argentine exports, the favorable terms of trade stabilized the currency. Thus, the success of the elite’s economic program won for them the support of the socialists, who from then on sought reform and not revolution. Social mobility also contributed to the bourgeois tendencies of the socialists. Eventually they became junior partners of the establishment. These are the historical roots of a spectacle that would puzzle some observers in 1945, when socialists and communists demonstrated against Perén in the company of reactionary landlords.

Already since coming to power, Peronism sparked numerous discussions on whether the movement should be supported by socialists and communists or not. While the Argentine communists initially opposed Perón, in June 1945 the Brazilian Communist Party would "affirm in the name of Prestes that the Communists in Argentina have made a serious mistake in aligning themselves against Farrell and Perón". In March 1946, Argentine communists changed their stance towards Perón to critical support. The 11th Party Congress and 6th National Assembly of the Argentine Communist Party, both held in late 1946, voted "to recognize the positive aspects of the government's management" and to praise economic policies of Perón. The party also declared that any coup attempts against Perón must be opposed, as they "would only benefit the country's reactionary sectors and the imperialist monopolies."

In 1947, the leader of the Brazilian Communist Party, Luiz Carlos Prestes, declared that "we [Brazilian communists], and myself in particular, know what President Perón's political orientation is: eminently democratic". Similar sentiment was expressed by Pablo Neruda, a senator of the Chilean Communist Party, who remarked: "There is no fascism in Argentina. Perón is a caudillo but he is not a fascist boss." In 1955, Argentine communists called for popular mobilization in support of the Peronist regime, warning that the anti-Peronist coup is led by "reactionary elements in the service of Yankee imperialism and the oligarchy".

In his autobiography titled My Life: A Spoken Autobiography, Fidel Castro praised Perón as a revolutionary anti-imperialist who carried out social reforms. Castro also stated:

There have been many heroic revolutionary feats on the part of military men in the twentieth century. Juan Domingo Perón, in Argentina, was also from a military background. (...) Perón made some mistakes: he offended the Argentine oligarchy, humiliated it - he nationalized its theatre and other symbols of the wealthy class - but the oligarchy's political and economic power remained intact, and at the right moment it brought Peron down, with the complicity and aid of the United States. Perón's greatness lay in the fact that he appealed to that rich country's reserves and resources and did all he could to improve the living conditions of the workers. That social class, which was always grateful and loyal to him, made Perón an idol, to the end of his life.

When Perón died in 1974, Castro declared three days of mourning and Cuban officials termed Peron's death "a blow to all Latin America". Castro noted the affinity and similarities between his ideology and Peronism, and cited Che Guevara letter's in which Che stated that "Peron was the most advanced embodiment of political and economic reform in Argentina". Loris Zanatta argues that both Castro and Perón represented "a case of 'nationalist socialism'". According to Zanatto, Castro was "a full member of the same family" as Perón, and that "from Hugo Chávez to the Sandinista revolution, from liberation theology to radical indigenism, the chromosomes of Peronist national socialism recur in the Latin American populist tradition."

Perón was an important inspiration of Chavismo, the ideology of Hugo Chávez, who called himself "a true Peronist". Eric Hershberg, director of the Center of Latin American Studies, wrote: "For a number of years I've been struck by Chavismo as being the closest thing to Peronism that Latin America has seen in decades." Chávez's successor, Nicolás Maduro, also stressed the ideological bond between Peronism and Chavismo. In July 2024, Maduro stated: "I am a Peronist and an Evista." In 2025, Maduro chanted "Attention, attention, Maduro is also a soldier of Perón." (Spanish: Atención, atención, Maduro también es soldado de Perón).

Perón was also regarded positively by Mao Zedong. When visiting pro-Perón Maoist militias in Argentina, Mao reportedly stated: "If I were a young Argentinian, I would be a Peronist." This quote was promoted by the Revolutionary Communist Party of Argentina, who advertized their movement by stating: "If Mao had been Argentine, he would have been a Peronist." Perón responded in kind, stating that "if he had been Chinese he would be a Maoist". Perón also wrote that "Marxism is not only not in contradiction with the Peronist Movement, but complements it."; he argued in his speech from 12 November 1972: "We must not be frightened by the word socialism". On his trip to Communist Romania, Perón concluded that "the regime in that country is similar, in many respects, to Justicialism". Historian Camilo Aguirre Torrini wrote on the relationship between Maoism and Peronism:

Perón initiated an epistolary relationship with Mao a few years earlier [than 1973] and both shared basic agreements on the new global order and the leading role of developing countries. [...] The degree of agreement between the two leaders was such that the [Peronist] Third Position was seen as a precursor to Mao's Three Worlds Theory, which led Perón to state: "That mischievous little Chinese is stealing my ideas." Meanwhile, the Chinese leader would do the same in 1969 before a delegation of young Argentine communists who, after vehemently expressing their Maoist beliefs, were challenged by the Great Helmsman [Mao] with the question: "Why aren't you Peronists?"

Peronism was supported by Joseph Stalin due to its hostility towards the United States, and after Perón's removal from power, the Soviet government had "a certain nostalgia for the Peronist government". American historian Garrett John Roberts, who described Peronism as an "ultranationalist socialist labor movement" and Perón's policies as "socialist and nationalist", states that there was some affinity between Perón and Stalin, as Perón modeled his Five Year Plan on the economic plans carried out by Stalin. Socialist Yugoslavia was also said to have expressed interest and fascination with Peronism in the 1950s.

There was a mutual admiration between Peronist Argentina and North Korea. Camilo Aguirre Torrini wrote that Peronism was close "not only to the Maoist doctrine of the three worlds, but also to the precepts of Kim Il Sung, who, like Perón, advocated a socialism with indigenous roots." Peronist newspapers referred to Kim Il Sung as 'the great leader' and considered Juche very similar to justicialism; one Peronist newspaper referred to North Korea as "the Justicialist Democratic Republic". In September 1973, in a speech to the Peru-Korea Institute of Culture and Friendship, Kim Il Sung praised Perón:

Today the peoples of the third world are raising their powerful voice for independence. Some time ago, General Perón of Argentina said that his country was making a revolution in the Argentine way which is different from the capitalist way and the socialist way of a certain country [post-Stalin USSR]. This means, in effect, that he is carrying out the revolution in an independent way. It is very important to adhere to independence in the revolutionary struggle. I consider that his slogan is excellent.

== Ideology ==
=== Twenty Peronist Tenets ===
From Perón's "Peronist Philosophy":

1. "A true democracy is that one in which the government does what the people want and defends only one interest: the people's."
2. "Peronism is essentially of the common people. Any political elite is anti-people, and thus, not Peronist."
3. "A Peronist works for the movement. Whoever, in the name of Peronism, serves an elite or a leader, is a Peronist in name only."
4. "For Peronism, there is only one class of person: those who work."
5. "Working is a right that creates the dignity of men; and it's a duty, because it's fair that everyone should produce as much as they consume at the very least."
6. "For a good Peronist, there is nothing better than another Peronist." (In 1973, after coming back from exile, in a conciliatory attempt, and in order to lessen the division in society, Peron reformed this tenet to: "For an Argentine, there is nothing better than another Argentine.")
7. "No Peronist should feel more than what he is, nor less than what he should be. When a Peronist feels more than what he is, he begins to turn into an oligarch."
8. "When it comes to political action, the scale of values of every Peronist is: Argentina first; the movement second; and thirdly, the individuals."
9. "Politics are not an end, but a means for the well-being of Argentina: which means happiness for our children and greatness for our nation."
10. "The two arms of Peronism are social justice and social help. With them, we can give a hug of justice and love to the people."
11. "Peronism desires national unity and not struggle. It wants heroes, not martyrs."
12. "Kids should be the only privileged class."
13. "A government without doctrine is a body without soul. That's why Peronism has a political, economic and social doctrine: Justicialism."
14. "Justicialism is a new philosophy of life: simple, practical, of the common people, and profoundly Christian and humanist."
15. "As political doctrine, Justicialism balances the right of the individual and society."
16. "As an economic doctrine, Justicialism proposes a social market, putting capital to the service of the economy and the well-being of the people."
17. "As a social doctrine, Justicialism carries out social justice, which gives each person their rights in accordance to their social function."
18. "Peronism wants an Argentina socially 'fair', economically 'free' and politically 'sovereign'."
19. "We establish a centralized government, an organized State and a free people."
20. "In this land, the best thing we have is our people."

Peronism as an ideology had many factions and manifestations, often completely contradictory for each other; however, the political thought and policies of Juan Perón are considered to be the core of Peronism. As an ideology, Peronism had authoritarian and populist components, which was a blend of several ideologies and currents and a traditional Argentinian style of leadership (caudillismo), which featured a charismatic leader leading a broad front. Christopher Wylde defines Peronism as "a form of leftist–populist nationalism, rooted in an urban working-class movement that was allied to elements of the domestic bourgeoisie as well as the military." The legitimacy of Peronism derived from trade unions who gave Perón their support, and his ideology was a reflection of demands and expectations of the Argentinian labor movement. According to British historian Daniel James, the reliance of Peronism on trade unions was so strong, that in the Peronist movement, "the initiative very much lay with the trade union movement; Perón was more its creature than the labor movement was his."

Peronist economic and fiscal policy had three objectives which consisted of expanding public spending and giving the state the dominating role in production and distribution (economic nationalism), egalitarian distribution of national income (therefore Peronism is considered to represent syndicalism and/or non-Marxist socialism), and implementing a system of incentives and rewards that would direct economic activities towards local markets while severely limiting production for international markets (protectionism). Perón's policies included extensive worker rights legislation and redistribution of wealth; Peronism rejected individualism in favor of communitarianism and sought a system that would reject both capitalism and liberalism in favor of an economic system that would be oriented around "social equity, rather than the individual pursuit of wealth." This was combined with the Peronist redefinition of citizenship, as Perón attracted and empowered groups that were hitherto excluded socially and economically – urban impoverished, immigrant communities and unionised workers. Throughout his lifetime, Peron attacked capitalism or aspects of the system.

Deriving from 1930s anti-imperialist nationalism, Peronist doctrine had three leading principles, as laid out by Perón: economic independence, political sovereignty, and social justice. Perón considered Argentina "an economic colony of Great Britain" and sought to liberate Argentina from both British and American influence; Perón's foreign policy was formulated as "third position" and was a forerunner of thirdworldism – Perón argued that instead of looking to either Western capitalism or Soviet communism, Argentina should carve out its own path and seek alliances with like-minded nations that would reject imperialism and foreign influence in favour of absolute sovereignty. As a requirement for this sovereignty, Peronism featured extensive redistributive and nationalist policies – Perón established a central bank, nationalized foreign commerce and implement a system of free, universal education. Socially, Peronism was authoritarian, yet it also implemented free suffrage and promoted causes such as feminism, indigenous rights and emancipation of the working class. Peter Ranis wrote that "paradoxically, Perón democratized Argentina in the sense of bringing the working class more fully into the political process, though his administrations often placed cultural and political restrictions on the opposition that severely compromised that democracy."

Writing on Perón and his ideology, Charles D. Ameringer argued that "The rise to power of Juan Perón in 1943 was not the end of the socialist impulse in Argentina; it was the culmination" and added that "much of the social legislation either introduced or implemented by Perón . . . originated with the Socialist Party." Raanan Rein similarly wrote that Peronism as an ideology was nationalist populism, shaped by the Catholic social teaching as well as "socialist currents of varying nuances". Rein attributed the socialist component of Peronism to policies that would give new sociocultural and political dimensions to Argentinian identity and nationalism. According to Rein, "Peronism rehabilitated popular culture and gave folklore a place in Argentine culture, attempted to rewrite national history and included various ethnic minorities who, up until that point, had been relegated to the margins of the nation – as was the case for Arabs and Jews." Peronism is thus credited with creating the image of multicultural Argentina through his policies that would redistribute the wealth while also promoting the concept of Argentina as a society of "multiple collective ethnic identities".

Peron described his ideology as "intrinsically Argentine" and a reflection of the Argentinian people. Perón's preferred wording for his ideology was justicialism, which he used to promote social justice as the core of his ideology. He wrote: "like the people, justicialism is national, social, and Christian." Peronist communitarian philosophy envisioned a society that would be an organized community, where each individual was to fulfill a social function "in the service of all", and also have access to an extensive complex of faculties, each designed for a different special task, that would contribute to 'individual happiness'. Establishing his populist rhetoric, Perón also defined his ideology as "a new philosophy of life, simple, practical, popular, profoundly Christian, and profoundly humanistic", adding that Peronism was to be class-based, as justicialism "centers its ideology and preoccupation on . . . the primacy in our country of a single class, the class of those who work." In his writings, Perón consistently emphasized that the roots of his ideology are based on Catholic doctrine as well as socialism; around the end of his second term, Perón argued: "We believe that there are only two philosophies in the world that can embrace and give direction to the major ideological orientations: one is Christian philosophy, which is already 2,000 years old and has continued to sustain itself through 20 centuries; and the other is Marxist philosophy, which is the philosophy of communism... There is no other."

According to Brennan, as a populist mixture, Peronism synthesized multiple ideologies and schools of thought, which he listed as nationalism, anti-imperialism, socialism, authoritarianism, federalism and militarism. Robert Crassweller offers a different definition, arguing that "Peronism may be defined roughly as an authoritarian populist movement, strongly colored by Catholic social thought, by nationalism, by organic principles of Mediterranean corporatism, and by the caudillo traditions of the Argentine Creole civilization." Other definitions include that of Donald C. Hodges, who saw Peronism as "a Christian and humanist version of socialism" and a "peculiar brand of socialism". Peter Ranis notes that describing Peronism is made difficult by vague language of Perón as well as his constant pragmatic shifts that he took throughout his life - Perón often modified his rhetoric and promoted different movements in order to maintain his big-tent movement that apart from consisting of trade unions, included both left-wing and right-wing supporters. Nevertheless, Ranis wrote that Peronism was a "worker-type populism" that one can roughly describe as "corporate democratic socialism", despite the authoritarian tendencies of Perón himself. Despite opportunistically declaring his opposition to Communism and even socialism, Perón nevertheless described his justicialism as "national socialism" (socialismo nacional) and "Christian national socialism" (socialismo national cristiano); to Ranis, Perón "fused an indigenous socialism with Argentine nationalism through Peronism", and used Marxist rhetoric:

Peron's usage of Marxist terminology, but within a nonsocialist context, is striking. He spoke of the "proletarians," the "exploitation of man by his fellow man," the "dehumanization of capital." At the same time, Peron expressed fears of foreign ideological penetration's and continually reiterated the need to avoid class conflict between capital and labor. His critique of Marxism was centered on what he called humanist and Christian attitudes — which, if applied, would render class struggle irrelevant. Peron's corporatist scheme already was one of class collaboration under the auspices and direction of the state. What Peron offered was not the individual consciousness of the unreconstructed liberal, nor the class consciousness that he identified with foreign and alien alternatives, but a unified, communitarian, social consciousness that would assuage class warfare, avoid the contamination of international socialism, and organize society to transcend the old liberal conceptions of the state.

Alternatively, Peronism was also denounced as fascism by some scholars. Carlos Fayt believed that Peronism was "an Argentine implementation of Italian fascism". Such conclusion was also reached by Paul M. Hayes, who argued that "the Peronist movement produced a form of fascism that was distinctively Latin American". This belief was particularly popular in the United States, as the American government sought to discredit Perón on the basis of his anti-Americanism, suspected communist sympathies, and neutrality during WW2. Similarly, anti-Peronists on the left such as anti-nationalist socialists also described Peronism as fascist. Some scholars, such as Lipset, tried to combine this view together with the conclusions that Peronism was a worker-based and a left-leaning movement; to this end, Lipset wrote that "If Peronism is considered a variant of fascism, then it is a fascism of the left because it is based on the social strata who would otherwise turn to socialism or Communism as an outlet for their frustrations." Most scholars rejected this view – Felipe Pigna wrote that no researcher who has deeply studied Perón should consider him a fascist. Goran Petrovic Lotina and Théo Aiolfi wrote that "Peronism was never a form of fascism during Juan Perón's first presidencies (1946-55). Nor was Peronism fascistic in its subsequent incarnations over the past seventy-five years from the 1970s revolutionary leftist Montonero guerilla organization to the neoliberal centre-right presidency of Carlos Menem." Daniel James wrote that Perón "took his ideas principally from social catholic, communitarian ideologues rather than from any pre-1955 fascistic theory." Robert Crassweller explains:

One should first clear away the inappropriate definitions and parallels. Thus: Peronism was not fascism. Some of Peronism's adherents had a fascist outlook and mentality. Peron himself admired Mussolini and the idea of the corporate state. Some of the trappings of Peronism recalled the ambiance of the Black Shirts. But all this was relatively superficial. No fascist society was ever erected on a mass base of laboring and dispossessed hordes. In its own descriptions of identity, Peronism rejected the Fascist parallel. It was more intimately grounded in the national history and ethos than was any European fascism. The structure of the Peronist state after the constitutional amendments of 1949 remained that of the old Argentine democratic order.

Peronism was not nazism. Peronism's main thrust reflected no adherence to Nazi principles. There were occasional minor aggressions against synagogues (and Protestant churches) and the police reaction was not always rigorous, but Peronism as such had no anti-Semitic or other racial bias. As Ambassador Messersmith reported at length in May 1947, "There is not as much social discrimination against Jews here as there is right in New York or in most places at home." In this, Peron did not scramble for the moral high ground in the spirit of a crusader; that was not his style. Practical awareness was always at the forefront of his politics, and in the 1940s there were half a million Jews in Argentina, along with an equal number of Arabs. His private preference was for the Arabs, partly because he believed they assimilated more completely into Argentine society and partly, one may assume, because of the Islamic elements in his beloved Hispanic heritage; but the potential conflict between these ethnic rivals had to be muted in the interests of the organic state, and there was no official anti-Semitism.

Peronism was not a dictatorship. Admittedly, definition is a factor here, but as the American embassy stated in April 1948, "... Peron is far from being a dictator in the sense of having absolute authority." This viewpoint was explicitly adopted in the Department of State's Secret Policy Statement of March 21, 1950. The cabinet debated measures at length. The army concerned itself with foreign policy. Peron often had to bargain for support, to trim his sails on the timing of initiatives, and to balance interests that could not be overridden.

== Internal currents ==
Peronism as well as anti-Peronism have both spanned the entire ideological spectrum, including far-right fascism, far-left Marxism, center-left social democracy, and center-right neoliberalism. This led to both left-wing as well as right-wing Peronist regimes in Argentina, with competing wings of Peronism fighting not only anti-Peronist forces, but also each other. Early Peronism of the 1940s and 1950s was heavily based on left-wing and socialist rhetoric, with Perón largely relying on his socialist supporters and trade unions movements; Raanan Rein notes that the ideology and policies of Peronism "were based largely on concepts that had been forged by the Argentine left wing in various debates since the beginning of the century and that had been expounded by people such as Justo, Dickmann, Ugarte, and Palacios." Similarly, Daniel James observed that in the Peronist movement, "the initiative very much lay with the trade union movement; Perón was more its creature than the labor movement was his."

After being overthrown and exiled from Argentina in 1955, Perón shifted his rhetoric further leftwards and promoted Cuban Revolution as well as liberation theology, which gave rise to the far-left wing of Peronism, Tendencia Revolucionaria. Born in an anti-Peronist Argentinian family, Cuban revolutionary Che Guevara visited Perón and praised Peronism as "indigenous Latin American socialism with which the Cuban Revolution could side". Likewise, left-wing Catholic priests embraced Peronism, calling it an effective realization of liberation theology, and arguing that Peronism and Catholicism were united in their goals of "love for the poor, for those persecuted for defending justice and for fighting against injustice". However, after Perón's return to power in 1973, the right-wing Peronist faction started growing in strength, mainly thanks to the conflict of left-wing Peronists such as the Montoneros with powerful trade unions. Between the mid-1970s and 1990s, Peronism was then dominated by right-wing factions such as far-right Orthodox Peronism and neo-liberal Menemism under President Carlos Menem; Peronism would shift back to the left afterwards and came to be dominated by left-wing Kirchnerism, described as a Peronist current that "returned the Peronist Justice Party to its traditional center-left stance following a long detour to center-right neoliberalism under Carlos Menem". In the 21st century, Peronists have embraced generally center-left positions, while anti-Peronists are generally on the center-right.

Despite the extreme ideological divergences amongst anti-Peronists as well as Peronists, Peronism as a general ideology is often considered left-wing populist. Historian Daniel James argues that "Peronism within the Peron/anti-Peron dichotomy that dominated the political and social context was per se leftist, anti-establishment and revolutionary". Because of this, the current dominant faction of Peronism, left-wing Kirchnerism, is seen as a "back-to-roots" movement that reclaimed the ideology of "classical Peronism". Nevertheless, the Justicialist Party is not considered left-wing as it also contains 'dissident Peronists' opposed to left-wing Kirchnerism and following the marginalized right-leaning strands of Peronism instead. The core tenets of Peronism include defense of nationalism, anti-imperialism and laborism, together with political sovereignty, economic independence and social justice being the three primary pillars of the justicialist movement.

=== Neo-Peronism ===
Vandorism or neo-Peronism was the expression of Argentine trade unionism, which conceived of itself as a trade union party, a factor of power, a force of its own that came to claim for itself the political representation of Peronism and assumed Peronism "without Perón", during the Peronist resistance since 1955. It was promoted mainly by the center-right party Unión Popular. Neo-Peronism lacked a coherent ideology and represented the pragmatic, realpolitik stance of Vandor and the trade unions' bureaucracy, as Vandor was convinced that Perón's return to Argentina is impossible and objected to Perón's endorsement of the left-wing, revolutionary wings of Peronism. Neo-Peronism was a conciliatory tendency that sought to integrate Peronist trade unions (or at least their leadership) into the Argentinian status quo and seek an agreement with anti-Peronist governments. After announcing "Peronism without Perón" in 1965, Vandor envisioned consolidating his movement by transforming the Justicialist Party into a laborist one akin to the British Labour Party, arguing that his goal is "to transform the [Peronist] Movement into a political party to represent the workers under the existing regime".

By trying to create a movement detached from Perón that would embrace the 'post-Peronist' politics of Argentina, Neo-Peronism greatly alienated growing left-wing factions within Peronism, including revolutionaries and radicalized trade unions, which Perón exploited. After the downfall of Perón in 1955, the Argentinian working class grew increasingly heterogeneous, as the wages of workers in dynamic industrial sectors grew and the wages of workers of declining industries decreased. By 1966, unskilled metalworkers were better paid than skilled workers in most Argentinian industries, which led to the development of "labour aristocracy" within the labour ranks. According to Richard Gillespie, this 'labour aristocracy' formed the backbone of Neo-Peronism, whereas poor workers stayed loyal to Juan Perón, allowing Perón to isolate Vandor politically by gaining the support of the trade-unionist rank and file members. Vandorists promoted the idea of "business unionism" that assumed collaborating with big capital, native monopolies and international corporations, while also imposing the trade-union movements on the state. This concept allowed left-wing Peronists to accuse Vandor of supporting imperialism.

Neo-Peronists attempted to take over the Justicialist Party and reorganized its leadership to be composed of a seven-member body with a pro-Vandor majority. Vandorists sought to reorganize the Peronist movement from the bottom up" and for the Justicialist Party to become a "democratic and solidly structured party", where Perón was to act as a mere figurehead and have no real authority. To this end, Neo-Peronism was successfully derailed by Perón, who in 1965 sent his wife Isabel to mobilize Peronist opposition to Vandor and then made overtures to Vandor's left-wing opponents in the Peronist trade union movement. In the 1966 Argentinian Senate election, Perón won a decisive victory against Neo-Peronists by preventing Vandor-backed candidates from winning seats. According to Steven Levitsky, "the election effectively destroyed the neo-Peronist project." After the 1966 military coup in Argentina shortly after the election, Perón continued encouraging revolutionary Peronists in mobilizing armed clandestine resistance against the anti-Peronist regime in Argentina. Despite losing his influence by then, Vandor was assassinated on 30 June 1969 by the Peronist guerillas of Comando Camilo Torres, a Peronist and Camilist organization that would later become the Montoneros.

=== Orthodox Peronism ===
Orthodox Peronism was the sector of Peronism that prevailed mainly (together with La Tendencia) at the end of the 60s, during the Peronist resistance, and that demanded total attachment to Perón's presidencies. In the consolidation of Orthodoxy, it included the most intransigent sectors of Peronism and, therefore, the most reluctant to accept any type of agreement with the government. With Peron's return to the presidency and his notable attachment to the most nationalist sectors of Peronism, it began to encompass those most reactionary sectors of the Peronist right that repudiated the sectors proclaimed revolutionary of Peronism identified as the Revolutionary Tendency. These sectors never identified themselves as the Peronist right, and claimed the title of Third Position, moving away from both the United States and the USSR. Historians mention not making the mistake of classifying them only within the political spectrum on the political right, since it also included those centrist sectors that wanted to distance themselves from Revolutionary Peronism. Orthodox Peronists ruled Argentina during the short-lived presidency of Isabel Perón between 1974 and 1976, but maintained party control after the 1976 Argentine coup d'état. The faction suffered a massive setback after the defeat of its candidate Ítalo Luder in the 1983 Argentine general election, and lost its lingering influence to the renewal wing of Peronism in 1987 under Antonio Cafiero.

=== Revolutionary Peronism ===
Revolutionary Peronism, also known as the Peronist "Revolutionary Tendency" (Spanish: Tendencia Revolucionaria) were those sectors of Peronism, mainly young, who, influenced by the world historical moment they were going through, began to relate the essence of Peronism to the socialist revolution. Revolutionary Peronism developed after Perón's overthrow and exile in 1955, and introduced Marxist doctrines into Peronism; because the Peronist movement perceived itself as a revolutionary force, its ban in Argentina allowed Peronist intellectuals to rekindle the Peronist promise of revolutionary social economic transformation and national liberation.

The movement was mainly based on the writings and ideology of John William Cooke, whom in 1956 Perón gave the mandate to command all organized Peronist forces in Argentina and to take full control of the movement in case of his death. Using his position as de facto leader of Peronism during Perón's absence, Cooke promoted revolutionary goals and presented Peronism as a movement that was "antibureaucratic, socialist, profoundly national, and sister to all the world's exploited [peoples]", and praising Perón as the "leader of national liberation". In 1960, Cooke moved to Revolutionary Cuba, where he combined Peronism with Guevarism, Castroism and the foco theory.

Perón himself also endorsed embracing Marxism and identified Peronist struggle with the Cuban Revolution, further giving the movement legitimacy. He endorsed revolutionary Peronist groups such as the Montoneros and supported their struggle as a realisation of his justicialist doctrine, agreeing with the Montoneros' conclusion that "the only possible road for the people to seize power and install national socialism is total, national, and prolonged revolutionary war . . . [following] the methods of rural and urban guerrillas." In addition, he allied himself with left-wing Peronist Andres Framini against the more conservative Augusto Vandor, who promoted "Peronism without Perón". Following Vatican II that led to development of anti-capitalist, revolutionary and Marxist-aligned rhetoric amongst Latin American clergy, Perón also gained support of left-wing Catholics who supported the far-left liberation theology. Left-wing priests praised Peronism as a precursor to liberation theology, and the Movement of Priests for the Third World argued that "the Peronist movement, revolutionary, with its massive force... will necessarily lead to the revolution which will make possible an original and Latin American socialism."

Revolutionary Peronism was of great relevance during the Peronist resistance and the violent decades of the 60s and 70s. Beginning in 1969, Revolutionary Peronists were responsible for a wave of bombings, kidnappings and assassinations that rocked Argentina. Revolutionary violence by Peronist guerilla groups caused massive public unrest and opposition to the anti-Peronist regime, and Peronist fighters were met with a sympathetic response among the population. This faction is thus credited with the downfall of the anti-Peronist government and the return of Perón to power in 1973. This area of Peronism is mainly classified as left or extreme left in the political spectrum, due to its large presence in the guerrilla sphere. The Tendency was mainly at odds with the Peronist Right and the Peronist Orthodoxy.

=== Renovation Peronism ===
The Peronist Renovation emerged as an internal current in Peronism after the electoral defeat of 1983. It was formally constituted in 1985 by publishing its foundational manifesto signed by its national leaders: Antonio Cafiero, Carlos Grosso and Carlos Menem. Therefore, it constituted those Peronists who wanted to distance themselves from the process witnessed during the seventies with Peronist orthodoxy and the revolutionary tendency. Ideologically, it articulated the national-popular values of Peronism with liberal democracy values, such as the rule of law, deliberation and representative democracy. At the same time, it brought together sectors from the center and the right-wing.

=== Menemism ===
Menemism is a term that designates the configuration of discursive and symbolic elements that accompanied the actions of the governments of Carlos Saúl Menem as head president of the Argentine Republic during the years 1989–1999. Menem broke with the protectionist and anti-capitalist Peronist orthodoxy in favor of sharply neoliberal policies, including curtailing social spending, privatization, liberalizing trade and tying Argentinian currency to the US dollar. It is also used to designate that ideological movement around his figure, whose neoliberal ideology is described as centre-right or right-wing.

=== Federal Peronism ===
Federal Peronism, also called dissident Peronism, is that non-Kirchnerist or anti-Kirchnerist Peronism that emerges as an alternative to it. It is a space that covers various sectors of right or center Peronism. Federal Peronism lacks a coherent ideology and fails to stand out from, Cambiemos coalition, particularly on economic grounds. Federal Peronism is overall more social conservative than Kirchnerism while still following the Peronist tenets of economic nationalism and social justice.

The movement represents first and foremost the diverse interests of state-level Peronist activists and leaders, who stay in opposition to Kirchnerism. Electorally, the goal of Federal Peronism was to prevent voters disaffected with Kirchnerism from defecting to anti-Peronist parties and present itself as a "third-way" candidacy that would maintain the diverse support bases of the Peronist movement. In comparison to Kirchnerism, Federal Peronism puts an emphasis on more republican and less populist values, and focuses more on regionalist and decentralist causes. It seeks to represent "Peronism before Kirchnerism" and promotes Peronist features that the movement had before being "re-founded" by Kirchnerism, which restored Peronism to the left-wing orientation it had under Juan Perón.

Federal Peronism sought to define itself as and represent the "Peronism before Kirchnerism", and thus constitute a return to perceived original Peronist values of the 1990s. In contrast to Kirchnerism, Federal Peronism emphasized popular conservatism and promoted neoliberal, pro-business policies that were meant to "create jobs"; socially, the Federal Peronism emphasizes crime and the theme of law and order. Unlike Peronism itself, Federal Peronism relied on middle-class support rather than labour.

The Federal faction of Peronism was largely rebuked in the 2011 Argentine general election, and has lost control of the Justicialist Party ever since. The Peronist movement shifted further to the left under the presidency of Cristina Fernández de Kirchner. Political scientist Pierre Ostiguy noted that while the Kirchnerism of Cristina Kirchner that has since dominated the Peronist movement is not "particularly Peronist", it is "clearly leftist" and could be seen as the Peronist movement aligning itself closer to the conventional left.

=== Kirchnerism ===
Kirchnerism is a center-left political movement centered around the governments of Néstor Kirchner and Cristina Fernández de Kirchner. In 2019, Kirchnerism won the vice presidency of the Nation with Cristina Kirchner herself and with the sectors of federal Peronism, Alberto Fernández as president. In international politics they usually describe it as a movement of the political left.

== Perón's policies ==
=== Socialism, nationalism, and populism ===
Perón's ideas were widely embraced by a variety of different groups in Argentina across the political spectrum. During his rule, Perón followed populist policies with an emphasis on social justice, and implemented what was described as "a combination of socialist and corporatist ideas with a strong nationalist accent." Peronism underwent a transformation in popular perception, as initially much of the left condemned it as a fascist or an otherwise totalitarian and demagogic ideology - later many came to see it as progressive given its anti-imperialist and anti-oligarchic orientation. Emilio Ocampo noted that Peronism "incorporated revolutionary Marxist elements and rhetoric, always appealing to a strong nationalist sentiment." Rafael di Tella argues that Peronism combined elements of political Catholicism with socialism, which appealed to the Argentine working class and placed Perón "on the left side of the political spectrum" in regards to his views and rhetoric. Federico Finchelstein states that Perón's ideology should be seen as "the synthesis of nationalism and non-Marxist Christian socialism".

Peronism is widely regarded as a form of Third World socialism, or a distinctly Argentinian kind of a populist, non-Marxist socialism akin to African socialism and Arab socialism. Perón's public speeches were consistently nationalist and populist. German political scientist Lisa Bogerts considers Peronism a "broader historical movement of communism and socialism", representing a movement different from the mainstream socialist movements in Argentina such as the Argentine Socialist Party. Ukrainian political scientist Oleksandr Kholod described Peronism as a combination of syndicalism, Argentine nationalism and Christian socialism. Jean-Pierre Reed wrote on Perón's policies:

The rise, popular and political appeal of Juan Perón and his political philosophy of Justicialismo in the 1940s and 1950s cannot be understood apart from the socialist antecedents of the previous decades for these set the stage, especially the socialist party, for the radical transformation of the Argentine state and economy under him. Perón worked tirelessly to install a welfare state and to achieve economic autonomy. Like Batlle y Ordóñez, although to a more extreme degree, he worked to nationalize the infrastructure and economy and implement social policies favorable to workers and the majority of the Argentine citizenry.

Some have classified Peronism as a form of social corporatism or corporate nationalism, arguing that by nationalizing Argentina's large corporations and several industries, Perón blurred the distinctions between corporations and government. At the same time, the state largely assumed the role of negotiator between conflicting interests between labor unions and employers, though Peronism heavily favored trade unions at the expense of business interests. Louis Proyect argues that Perón "embarked on a strongly leftist and pro-labor path" and "challenged all the old dominant classes in Argentina and promoted the class interests of the workers. However, Robert J. Alexander argues that Peronism was not corporatism, and notes that Perón "argued, among other things, that Mussolini had erred in trying to impose a corporative state structure on Italian society, an attempt which Peron saw as having been a failure." Economist Joseph Schumpeter described Peronist economy as such:

During the past ten years Argentina has become a clear-cut case of a managed economy. The Government itself comprises by far the outstanding power group and has developed an elaborate system for implementing its plans for guiding industrial or other economic developments into desired paths... The large landowners, who once constituted the principal economic and political pressure group of Argentina, are no longer of much influence... The government itself; and the bureaucracy which composes it has replaced them as the prevailing. There is close government control of many types of economic activity; and the official rather than the landlord or the businessman is at the helm.

Donald C. Hodges described Peronism as a "peculiar brand of socialism" that heavily incorporated elements of nationalism and Christian social teaching. Main sources of inspiration for Perón and his policies were the Italian fascism of Mussolini, British laborism and the American New Deal. However, Peronists would avoid the socialist label because the Socialist Party of Argentina was considered a part of the Infamous Decade establishment, and because atheist tenets of socialism would alienate the working-class supporters of Perón. This prompted the movement to use the label of "justicialism" instead. Nevertheless, Hodges argues that despite its eccentric character, Peronism was a "Christian and humanist version of socialism" that aimed to develop a syndicalist state. Perón did express sympathy towards socialism in his speeches, stating: "I have not the least doubt that in the twenty-first century the world will be socialist. . . whether it is called populism, socialism, or justicialism."

Trade union membership drastically increased under Perón, and amounted to 42% of Argentinian workforce by the time Perón was removed from office - a record in Latin America. Social justice, the main slogan of Peronism, was realized through redistributive policies, which allowed real wages to increase by 25% between 1943 and 1948, while the share of wages and salaries in the national income rose to 50% in 1950. Peronist regime would also introduce a radical reform of workers' rights - Perón implemented paid annual holidays and paid sick leave, established state-paid redundancy and dismissal compensation and workplace accident compensation. One of the most famous Peronist reforms was the aguinaldo, thirteenth-month bonus to salary which Perón described as his "Christmas present" for the workers.

The main and most distinctive element of Peronist economy was the "Social Pact". Perón aimed to turn Argentina into a syndicalist state that would eventually establish "socialism of the non-Marxist variety" as the core of its economy. Peronist "Social Pact" was a system of collective agreements between labour and capital, with the state acting as intermediary to establish an "equilibrium" between the two forces. Argentinian labor gradually increased its share of the national income, reaching 50% by 1955. Justicialism also assumed gradual introduction of organized labour into state legislature, which Perón implemented on a regional scale as an experiment - Chaco received a syndicalist constitution under which half of the state legislature was to be chosen by the provincial electorate of the General Confederation of Labour. Describing Perón's syndicalism, Hodges wrote: "This was a far cry from Fascist versions of the syndicalist state as representing both owners' associations and the trade unions. With functional representation limited to trade unions, Peron's democratic recasting of national syndicalism favored organized labor."

Peronism also lacked a strong interest in matters of foreign policy other than the belief that the political and economic influences of other nations should be kept out of Argentina—he was somewhat isolationist. Early in his presidency, Perón envisioned Argentina's role as a model for other countries in Latin America and proposed economical unions with the countries of this region, which was expressed with his phrase: "The 2000s will find us unionized or dominated", but such ideas were ultimately abandoned. Perón would also align himself with socialist states such as Castro's Cuba and Allende's Chile. In his 1972 Actualización política y doctrinaria para la toma del poder, Perón included "perhaps the most revolutionary guidelines ever issued in his name", advising his supporters to reject Soviet communism while accepting Fidel Castro and Mao Tse-tung as fellow allies against American imperialism.

Already in his first and second presidency, Perón maintained close relations with the Soviet Union, despite his superficially anti-communist rhetoric. Soviet authorities considered Perón an ally in their struggle against the US. argued that "Perón, with his own ambitions and hostility to the United States, is Stalin's logical choice". Following Perón's removal from power in 1955, "Soviet diplomats revelead a certain nostalgia for the Peronist government".

=== Attitudes towards Indigenous peoples ===
By the time Perón came to power for the first time, there were around 129,000 Indigenous Argentines in Argentina, amounting to around 0.8% of the total population. Despite their small numbers, Indigenous Argentines played a significant role in the populist rhetoric of Perónism. Perón presented himself as the champion of the working class and introduced a new kind of populist politics to Argentina that would heavily influence popular actions and the worker movement. Peronist rhetoric focused on the cult of the "common man" and vilified anti-Peronist groups which were portrayed as the establishment. Peronist appeal was successfully amplified by Eva Perón, whose fond and passionate speeches attracted the most marginalized parts of the Argentinian society.

Peronist rhetoric had significant appeal to "Argentinians" of non-Argentinian ancestry, and Perón legally recategorized them as equivalent to native Argentinians and attempted to reorganize the state institutions responsible for their welfare. Embracing both the Peronist rhetoric and principles of populism, Indigenous Argentine supporters of Peronism became known as the caciques, and inspired both political engagement and trust in state institutions amongst fellow Indigenous Argentines. Because of this, Peronism made national politics relevant to the non-Argentinian communities of Argenitina for the first time and helped integrate them into the previously disinterested Argentinian nation state. Mapuche leader Jeronimo Maliqueo described Indigenous Argentine peoples as "the first Peronists", with Perón turning a previously invisible group of Argentinian society into active political actors.

Given a near-total lack of national visibility of Indigenous Argentine communities in Argentina before 1943, Perón's eagerness to make direct overtures to non-Argentinians was revolutionary to 1940s Argentinian politics. Peron and Evita were frequently photographed alongside them, and Perón's second five-year plan from 1952 included a direct reference to them: "The indigenous population will be protected through the direct action of the state, via their progressive incorporation into the rhythms and [living] standards of general national life." According to government minister of Argentina, while the Indigenous population was extremely small, pro-Indigenous policies were included in Peronist plan because non-Argentinians had "always merited the affectionate concern of our President." Perón also designed 19 April as an international day of commemoration for non-Argentinian peoples.

The most important concession to the Indigenous community made by Peronism was its reform of the 1949 Constitution, which gave them legal status equivalent to the native Argentinian population by removing the document's references to "racial differences" between Indigenous people and other Argentinians. A Peronist legislator from Tucuman that took part in the rewriting of the constitution stated that non-Argentinian peoples "are as Argentine as we are ...I have seen them cheer for the country and for [the president] . . . in whom they have placed all their hopes for social redemption." As the result, Indigenous Argentines were able to receive military enrollment and citizenship papers for the first time, and were given voting rights under Perón. Seeking to utilize support for Perón amongst the non-Argentinian communities, Peronist activists would organize registration campaigns amongst them. Anthropologist Claudia Briones recalled that during her visit to a Mapuche village, one of her interlocutors remarked: "Peron made us people! He gave us documents."

According to Christine Mathias, "Perón enjoyed far more widespread popularity among indigenous people than any other Argentine leader". In 1943, Perón created labor ministry Secretario de Trabajo y Prevision, which was to oversee Indigenous affairs and reservations; a decree from 1945 declared that "the state's actions to protect indigenous populations have been characterized by narrowness and ineffectiveness, principally because they were never designated sufficient and lasting facilities or resources." In 1946 Perón then founded Direccion de Proteccion del Aborigen (DPA), with Mapuche leader Jeronimo Maliqueo becoming the director of the organization. Malique very frequently visited Indigenous Argentine communities in Argentina, pledging: "As the Indian I am, I will never abandon the cause of the Indians. I will continue to be a nuisance no matter who is in power." Malique's appointment reinvigorated Indigenous communities across Argentina. Toba leader Pablo Machado stated that the news had left all of the Toba-Qom people "with their hearts full of joy".

Efe Can Gürcan argues that the left-wing populist rule of Perón marked a "historical break with Argentina's tradition of indigenous repression, thanks to Perón's granting of citizenship and labor rights to indigenous communities". Perón's support for the "indigenous" cause as well as his reforms that considerably improved the legal and socioeconomic situation of Native American peoples in Argentina produced an environment that allow the national indigenous movement to emerge. The indigenous movement in Argentina would remain aligned with Peronism between 1955 and 1980, especially in the face of the political repression and rollback of Peronist reforms by the anti-Peronist military governments.

=== Attitudes towards Jews ===
Argentina has had the largest Jewish population in Latin America since before Perón came to power. After becoming president, he invited members of the Jewish community to participate in his government. One of his advisors was José Ber Gelbard, a Jewish man from Poland. Peronism did not have an antisemitic bias. The Jewish Virtual Library writes that while Juan Perón had sympathized with the Axis powers, Perón also expressed sympathy for Jewish rights and established diplomatic relations with Israel in 1949. Since then, more than 45,000 Jews have immigrated to Israel from Argentina".

Shortly after coming to power, Perón faced accusations of antisemitism from both his domestic opponents as well as the United States. Jeffrey K. Marder remarks that anti-Peronists "distorted the facts, hastily and erroneously characterizing Perón as an antisemite", while the United States Department of State portrayed Peronism as a "Nazi menace", publishing the "Blue Book" in 1946. However, most foreign observers started changing their view on Perón by late 1940s and early 1950s - in his 1953 book Peron's Argentina, American historian George I. Blanksten criticized Perón but credited him with disavowal of antisemitism. Likewise, the American Jewish Year Book reports from 1949 and 1950 delineated problems faced by the Jewish community in Argentina, but found little fault in Perón and his regime. Perón maintained cordial relations with Jewish groups and his interaction with the Jewish community mostly consisted of exchanging favors.

Perón's movement was mainly based on industrial workers and the labor movement, which became the very foundation of his support base. However, Perón also attempted to appeal to marginalized and outsider groups of Argentinian society, which included numerous ethnic and immigrant communities. Argentinian Jews had significant influence on socialist and communist parties and trade unions, but stayed on the margins of Argentine social and political life, facing both discrimination and assimilationist policies of the 1930s liberal government. Perón sought to recruit the Jewish community into his Peronist support base as to broaden the support for his "New Argentina" and also dispel the accusations of fascism.

In 1947, Perón founded Organización Israelita Argentina (OIA), the Jewish wing of the Peronist Party, in attempt to promote his ideology amongst the Jewish community. While OIA failed to attract much support of Argentinian Jews, it became an intermediary between Perón and the Jewish community. Argentinian Jews entered dialogue with Perón through IOA, securing favors and concessions. Jewish newspapers in Argentina particularly praised the socialist nature of Perón's planned economy, leading to limited expressions of support. Peronism allowed the Jewish community to actively participate in the political life of Argentina; Jewish writer Isaías Lerner remarked: "The triumph of Perón meant a greater participation of the [Jewish] community in the political arena. For the first time in Argentina's political history, a political party courted our community."

In the book Inside Argentina from Perón to Menem, author Laurence Levine, also former president of the U.S.–Argentine Chamber of Commerce, writes that "although anti-Semitism existed in Argentina, Perón's own views and his political associations were not anti-Semitic".

While Perón allowed many Nazi and other WWII-era Axis criminals to take refuge in Argentina, he also attracted many Jewish immigrants. Argentina has a Jewish population of over 200,000 citizens, one of the largest in the world.

=== Nasserism ===
Peronism is often compared and paralleled with Nasserism, or considered a variety thereof. In this context, Nasserism is described as a form of populism characterized by militarism, reformism and challenge to the status quo. 'Nasserite' populism finds its support in trade unions and the lower classes, and positions itself as a "social-revolutionary party" that unites itself not around an ideology, but a charismatic leader. Donald C. Hodges argues that Nasserism and Peronism are so similar that they became interchangeable when referring to the distinct type of populism both movements represented, writing: "The terms "Nasserism" and "Peronism" are interchangeable when applied to the younger generation of left-wing officers in Latin America." Workers' Revolutionary Party, a Trotskyist political party in Mexico, stated that both Perón and Nasser were an embodiment of Bonapartism, arguing that both movements represented what Leon Trotsky described as "those special governments that rely on the workers' movement, looking for a broader base in order to resist the excessive demands of imperialism."

According to Lily Pearl Balloffet, the connection between Nasserism and Peronism was not a mere coincidence, arguing that the Nasserist movement was inspired by Perón and actively engaged in translation projects to make the Peronist doctrine accessible and familiar to Arabic-speaking audiences. In 1953, Lebanese-Argentinian journalist Nagib Baaclini published an article named "Egypt Has Her Own Perón Now", in which he discussed both the ideological and political closeness of both regimes. When interviewed on the parallels between Perón and Nasser, a functionary of the Egyptian Legation, Ahmed Mattar, replied: "Naguib? ... He is the Perón of Egypt! You Argentines can understand Naguib perfectly, because you have had to fight doggedly, as we have, for your liberty, and you have achieved [this] thanks to your magnificent leader, who is similar to Naguib." Key common features of both regimes observed by the contemporary press were anti-imperialist nationalism, the 'Third Position' philosophy of non-alignment in the Cold War and "socialist" economic policies.

The "Third Position" espoused by Perón as well as Nasser is seen as the most important ideological feature of both regimes. In foreign policy, the "Third Position" meant that both Argentina and Egypt would follow a path of development that rejected American and Soviet imperialism in favor of a non-aligned, anti-imperialist stance. Economically, too, Perón and Nasser emphasized the need to pursue a different policy from that of American capitalism and Soviet communism - a non-Marxist socialism, which for Perón was a "national socialism" (or justicalism) and for Nasser an Arab socialism. The agrarian socialism of the Narodniks, the justicalism of Perón, the Arab socialism of Nasser and the "Third Universal Theory" of Gaddafi together form a group of "Third Position" economic policies. Political scientist Torcuato di Tella notes that apart from similar ideologies and policies, Nasserism and Peronism emerged in nearly identical socioeconomic conditions - both movements were able to come in power thanks to the large presence of reform-minded middle-ranking and low-ranking military officers. Di Tella refers to both regimes as representing "military socialism", along with the Brazilian Tenentism, 1968 Peruvian coup d'état and the Bolivian Socialist Revolution of 1936.

Political scientists Elie Podeh and Onn Winckler note that analyzing Nasserism will naturally "rely on insights derived from Latin American models, especially Peronism", arguing that both movements are exemplary of Third World populism. They also note that both regimes have similarities that go beyond populism - as their revolutionary and anti-imperialist ideology went beyond rhetoric and was translated into policies and profound changes in the societies of Argentina and Egypt, Peronism and Nasserism are credited with introducing egalitarianism to erstwhile inequal societies full of marginalized groups; they write: "As was the case in Argentina under Perón, the message of the [Nasserist] regime was clear: In the revolutionary era, talent, rather than social position, determined one's standing. Equal opportunities were open to all." Samir Amin likewise noted the 'progressive' character of both movements. On Nasser, he wrote: "Nasserism then achieved what it could: a resolutely anti-imperialist international posture and progressive social reforms." Similarly, Amin remarked on Perón: "Perónist populism was anti-imperialist and progressive in its own way. The excesses of language and manners by the general and his wife, Eva, should not take anything away from the positive measures made in favor of workers."

Reinhard C. Heinisch described Nasserism and Peronism as egalitarian and anti-imperialist, arguing that despite transcending conventional ideological boundaries, both movements had a discernible, similar ideology. Podeh and Winckler argue that Nasserism can be seen as an independent ideology and movement because it went beyond Egypt and affected the political development of the Arab World as the whole, while "Peronism and other forms of populism in Latin America have not radiated beyond state borders". However, Jean Bernadette Grugel notes that Peronism did have impact in the rest of Latin America - Víctor Paz Estenssoro and the Revolutionary Nationalist Movement of Bolivia identified with Peronism, and Carlos Ibáñez del Campo of Chile openly identified with Peronism. Feminist María de la Cruz, the campaign manager of Ibáñez, proclaimed:

This period of world revolution will go down in history as the century of Perón and Evita. These two are the most incredible and important characters of the period. Their thought is not only an ideology of the present, but also of the future... In Chile, the people identify totally with the justicialist doctrine. Peronism is as popular as Ibanismo in Chile... Peronism is the realisation of Christianity. So, the history of mankind will be divided into two important eras. From the first century to the twentieth century will be the Christian period, and from the twenty-first century onwards will be the Peronist period.

Peronism and its success also led Latin American socialist to reevaluate their stance towards populism - just like socialists of Argentina broke ranks to support Peronism as a form of anti-imperialism and socialism, Ibáñez was also seen as a movement worthy of support. Grugel wrote: Alejandro Chelén testified to the fact that admiration for Peronism contributed to the Socialists' decision to support Ibáñez: 'The echoes of Argentine Peronism, very much in fashion then, infected the atmosphere.'" Grugel notes that "Justicialismo, Titoism, Nasserism, Maoism and Castroism served as an example for the 'revolutionary' socialists of the 1960s". Workers Vanguard of the American Spartacist League also highlighted Peronism and Nasserism as dominating examples of "populist nationalism with a socialist coloration".

=== Relation to Catholicism ===
The ideology of Perón is considered to have been influenced by Catholic social teaching and to be a mixture of many political currents, one of them being social Catholicism. Peronism had a corporatist tendency that was rooted in social and political philosophy of the Catholic Church, with its origins in 19th-century Christian socialism and papal encyclicals of Popes Leo XII and Pius XI; this was a common denominator for other left-wing populist movements in the region, such as the one in Mexico and Peru. Peronism borrowed heavily from Catholic motifs, promising a harmonous society free of class conflict and describing its demand for social justice as the need to "humanize the capital" and to "counter a heartless and godless pecuniary capitalism". Perón himself described his ideology of justicalismo as a "unifying Christian movement", and according to Michael Goebel, Perón rhetoric "had its pedigree in the ideas of social Catholicism". Perón also used Catholic rhetoric to downplay the perceived socialist nature of his ideology, given that Argentinian socialism was unpopular amongst Peronist constituency because of its militant atheism; Hodges concludes that "Perón's peculiar brand of socialism played down the socialist label in favor of its national and Christian sources".

Initially, Perón had excellent relations with the Church - the Catholic Church recognized the 1943 coup and had cordial relations with the military junta, and Perón inherited cordial relations with the clergy, who placed great hopes in the new regime. The junta gained the support of the Church thanks to its decree from 31 December 1943, which introduced compulsory Catholic religious instruction in all public schools, and created the Department of Religious Instruction for the purpose of regulating religious education. Local Catholic hierarchy overwhelmingly favored Perón in the 1946 election, praising him for his focus on social welfare and referring to papal encyclicals. Argentine bishops issued a pastoral letter instructing Catholics to not vote for any part that advocated for a separation of Church and state, which was a direct blow at political opponents of Perón. The Catholic Church had also gained profound influence on Argentinian society after World War I given the decline of militant secularism that once permeated the upper and middle classes of Argentina. Because of this, "the Church was now recognised as a much-needed partner in any political project."

The relations between the Church and Perón turned sour around 1949, as Perón attacked the part of the clergy for being "a bastion of extravagance and display" that conflicted with the cult of simplicity that Peronism promoted. Perón argued that a "socially just" Argentina must reject lavishness in favour of "religion of humility" and "the religion of the poor, of those who feel hunger and thirst for justice." In 1952, the Church attacked Perón for allowing the screening of defamatory films in Buenos Aires, along with the introduction of gradual restrictions on religious education in schools. The rift between Peronist government and the Catholic clergy became especially visible in August 1952, when the death of Eva Perón was virtually ignored by the Church. In 1953, a part of Argentinian clergy became "worker-priests" in style of the movement popular amongst French priests at the time - worker-priests took blue-collar jobs in mines and factories to challenge communist dominance of labour unions in favour of promoting Christian socialism. Perón feared that Argentine worker-priests could also try to infiltrate Peronist trade unions this way, and the ambition amongst some Catholic circles to politically challenge Perón was confirmed in 1954, following the attempt to create a new Christian Democratic party that year.

By 1953, the relations with the Church became openly hostile, and Peronist legislation legalizing divorce and temporarily decriminializing prostitution further alienated the clergy. In 1954, Perón accused members of the clergy of organizing a conspiracy against the government, although he highlighted "that they were in no way representative of the Church in Argentina". Perón continued to attack what he described as "materialistic section of the clergy", and two Italian prelates were expelled from Argentina. Between 1954 and 1955, the government imprisoned several priests for short periods of time, accusing them of political meddling or infiltration of the state trade unions, and Peronist militias clamped down on Catholic processions and organizations. In June 1955, the Vatican excommunicated those responsible for government's deportation of two Italian priests from Argentina, without specifying any individual. Perón maintained that the excommunication did not include to him, claiming that he was not involved in the deportation in any way. According to an American historian Robert Crassweller, "the excommunication dated in 1955 did not, technically speaking, apply to Perón, "for it failed to comply with certain requirements of canon law." Nevertheless, many considered Perón excommunicated at the time, and his conflict with the Church is considered to have directly caused the military coup against him that year; David Rock argued that "Perón's regime finally collapsed when it turned against the church."

Perón gradually improved his relations with the Church when in exile. In 1961, the Church allowed Perón to marry Isabel Perón, and in 1963 he formally petitioned Pope John XXIII for pardon, which the Pope granted; the news of Perón's pardon did not become aware in Argentina until 1971. Perón would be greatly influenced by the Church during his exile, and was particularly fascinated by the progressive reforms introduced in Vatican II. He built bridges with left-wing Latin American clergy, who came to perceive Peronism as the political expression of the option for the poor. Peronism became seen as precursor of liberation theology, and Perón openly embraced liberation theology in his writings. Left-wing Argentinian priests founded the Movement of Priests for the Third World, who argued that "the Peronist movement, revolutionary, with its massive force, ... will necessarily lead to the revolution which will make possible an original and Latin American socialism." Perón also abandoned the term of justicalismo and instead described his ideology as "national socialism", which biographer Jill Hedges described as "an autochthonous form of socialism as opposed to international Marxism, not Nazism". Peronism came to be strongly associated with progressive and left-wing clergy in Argentina; Brazilian promotor of liberation theology Leonardo Boff described Pope Francis as a Peronist during his visit to Argentina in 2013, remarking that the Pope was "clearly defining that the enemy of the peoples is capitalism, and to say that he must have great courage: he has to be Argentine, he has to be a Jesuit and he has to be a Peronist." According to historian David F. D'Amico, "Perón was later forgiven by the Church, for he died on July 1, 1974, a faithful Catholic, and was administered extreme unction [by the Vatican] immediately before his death."

The fusion of liberation theology with Peronism in Argentina was credited with the rise of the far-left Peronist organization Montoneros. Leaders of Montoneros such as Mario Firmenich and Roberto Perdía were Catholic nationalists who belonged to the Catholic Action, and encountered Peronist priests such as Carlos Mugica there. David Copello argues that "in their case, religion paved the way towards Peronism", who embraced both the Christian socialism of liberation theology and nationalist socialism of Peronism. Michael Goebel argues that the formation of left-wing revolutionary organizations committed to Peronism was the result of Perón's ideology being formed out of mainly left-wing Catholicism rather than nationalist or neo-fascist currents. Montoneros represented a radicalization of Peronism, promoting Perón's return to Argentina as a first step towards "national liberation", embracing Marxism and naming "socialist fatherland" as their goal. Goebel concludes that Peronism represented an "anti-imperialist and third-world liberation movement more than right-wing Argentine nacionalismo." According to Richard Gillespie, "through its commitment to social justice and the popular cause, radical Catholicism drew many youths towards the Peronist Movement." From there, Peronists Catholics were radicalized into Marxism with the influence of priests such as Camilo Torres Restrepo, who promoted Peronism and liberation theology as alternative to atheist communism and argued that "revolution is not only permitted but is obligatory for all Christians who see in it the most effective way of making possible a greater love for all men". This resulted in the creation of various communist organizations that were "committed to Peronism, socialism, and armed struggle".

=== Criticism of Perón's policies ===
==== Authoritarianism ====
Political opponents maintain that Perón and his administration resorted to organised violence and dictatorial rule; that Perón showed contempt for any opponents, and regularly characterised them as traitors and agents of foreign powers. They also argue that Perón subverted freedoms by nationalising the broadcasting system, centralising the unions under his control and monopolising the supply of newspaper print. At times, Perón also resorted to tactics such as illegally imprisoning opposition politicians and journalists, including Radical Civic Union leader Ricardo Balbín; and shutting down opposition papers, such as La Prensa. In contrast, historian Alan Knight argues that while "Peronist democracy" fell short of modern standards for liberal democracy, it should nevertheless be seen as democraticizing in the context of Argentinian history:

It is not just that Peronist democracy was inherently flawed (...); rather, the difference lies in the status quo ante - the Peronist point of departure, and the yardstick against which Peronist 'democracy' should be judged. While, it is true, the immediately preceding regime - which ruled during the 'infamous decade' - was conservative, exclusionary, and, to a degree, oligarchic, a broader consideration of pre-1930 Argentina reveals a record of democratic inclusion, competitive electoral politics, free speech and relatively free association. Thus, within the broad sweep of the twentieth century, Peronism appears as socially progressive.

However, most scholars argue that Peronism was never dictatorial. Crassweller wrote on Peronism: "Peronism was not a dictatorship. As the American embassy stated in April 1948, ". . . Peron is far from being a dictator in the sense of having absolute authority." The army concerned itself with foreign policy. Totalitarian methods frequently appeared in the operations of the police, or in repression of the press, or in restrictions imposed on the conduct of opposition, but this falls short of a dictatorship. Peron often had to bargain for support, to trim his sails on the timing of initiatives, and to balance interests that could not be overridden. Strong and authoritarian and sometimes oppressive, yes. But not really dictatorial." Paul Corner and Jie-Hyun Lim similarly argued: "Peronism (like early Cold War populism as a whole) was not a dictatorship but an authoritarian form of democracy." Paola Raffaelli wrote: "Although some authors suggest that Peronism was a form of fascism, this was not the case. He was democratically elected and other parties and the Parliament were not banned, it did not pursue an ideology apart from a less-dependant nation, and Perón was in power three times for ten years within a twenty-eight years period of time."

==== Fascist influences ====
Perón's admiration for Benito Mussolini is well documented. Whether Peronism was fascist or not is heavily contested. Historian Federico Finchelstein, philosopher Donald C. Hodges and historian Daniel James argue that Perón was not fascist, while lawyer Carlos Fayt, historian Paul Hayes and political scientist Paul H. Lewis categorise Peronism as a fascist ideology, or as having been influenced by it. Carlos Fayt believed that Peronism was "an Argentine implementation of Italian fascism". Alternatively, Peronism is also considered "left-wing fascism". Referring to this view, Seymour Martin Lipset argued that "If Peronism is considered a variant of fascism, then it is a fascism of the left because it is based on the social strata who would otherwise turn to socialism or Communism as an outlet for their frustrations." Hayes reaches the conclusion that "the Peronist movement produced a form of fascism that was distinctively Latin American".

One of the most vocal critics of Peronism was the Argentine writer Jorge Luis Borges. After Perón ascended to the presidency in 1946, Borges spoke before the Argentine Society of Writers (SADE) by saying:

Dictatorships breed oppression, dictatorships breed servility, dictatorships breed cruelty; more loathsome still is the fact that they breed idiocy. Bellboys babbling orders, portraits of caudillos, prearranged cheers or insults, walls covered with names, unanimous ceremonies, mere discipline usurping the place of clear thinking [...] Fighting these sad monotonies is one of the duties of a writer. Need I remind readers of Martín Fierro or Don Segundo that individualism is an old Argentine virtue.

However, most scholars believe that Peronism was not a form of fascism. Summarizing the academic consensus on the issue, Arnd Scheider wrote that "most authors, analysing the phenomenon in retrospect agree that the term Fascism does not accurately describe Peronism." James P. Brennan remarked that "In general, even those authors convinced of the fascist character of Peronism recognize that its predominant characteristics resemble very little those of European fascism." Argentine historian Cristian Buchrucker outlines main reasons why Peronism cannot be characterized as fascism:

- Peronism developed in the early and mid 1940s during a period of economic growth - unlike Italian Fascism and German Nazism, which developed at a time of economic crisis;
- when Perón became Labour Secretary in 1943 and started to implement the first elements of his ideology, it did not mark the end of democracy (as in 1922's Italy and 1933's Germany). Rather, Perón succeeded the Infamous Decade, which had already seen prolonged military rule and authoritarian conservative governments, "thinly legitimized by fraudulent elections";
- Peronism was based primarily on the urban and urbanized rural working class. In contrast, the appeal of Italian Fascism and German Nazism was to the middle classes who were disillusioned with a lost World War I and economic crisis;
- while the societies of Italy, Germany and Argentina all perceived a threat of communism, only Italy and Germany had strong left-wing movements; Argentina lacked a strong left-wing movement, as socialist parties "had long been suppressed and ceased to play any tangible role", and "the working class, and the new urban poor, were without a real organizational voice" before Perón;
- the virulent, fascist territorial expansionism of Italy and Germany was absent in Peronism;
- unlike fascism, Peronism was an authoritarian, not a totalitarian political system, as Argentina never became a one-party state.

Similarly, political scientist John H. Kautsky argued that Peronism, as well as Nasserism, cannot be classified as fascist, as while fascism was "a movement of the propertied but impoverished and frustrated lower middle class, directed against labor and liberal intellectuals, with the support of the traditional land-owning aristocracy and capitalists in banking and heavy industry", Nasserism and Peronism were movements "aiming at industrialization, basing their power on the support of labor and peasants, and turning against the traditional aristocracy and often the capitalists".

Donald C. Hodges remarked that it is a "cheap academic trick to lump together fascism (...) and Peronism". Perón embraced the concept of the state as the juridical instrument that can only function within and serve the nation, but rejected the organic notions of the state assuming the dominating role by organizing the nation. Perón also prided himself in his doctrinal flexibility and elasticity, and agreed with national syndicalism of Primo de Rivera in principle, although he ultimately pursued a different political path. Hodges argues that "In view of both its gradualism and its concern for striking a balance between extremes, justicialism has more in common with the American New Deal than with either Italian fascism or German national socialism." Daniel James believes that the neo-corporatism of Peronism cannot be explained by any allegiance to fascist ideas, arguing that Perón "took his ideas principally from social catholic, communitarian ideologues rather than from any pre-1955 fascistic theory." As a response to Carlos Fayt who characterized Perónism as fascist, James P. Brennan wrote:

A close study of Peronist ideology, however, shows that the differences between it and fascism are greater than their few similarities. The central components of Justicialismo — that is, of Peronist ideology — have roots in the Social Christianism and national populism of the FORJA (the yrigoyenista, the nationalist youth wing of the Radical Party in the 1930s), and in syndicalism. Moreover, this synthesis proved to be more resilient over time than many had assumed. In Peronism's formative stage, the irrational vitalisme ("life" philosophy) and Social Darwinism of fascism had minimal and no influence, respectively. With regard to Italian corporatism, which ended up replacing the unions and democratic elections, it cannot be seriously compared with the syndicalist element in Peronism. Peronism's presumedly expansionist goals likewise are nowhere in evidence, and Sebreli's thesis does not stand up to the slightest analysis. The only similarity that can be acknowledged is the particular importance both ideologies granted to the concept of the leader. Whereas Italian fascism and German nazism destroyed the universal suffrage that had existed in those countries, Peronism on the other hand put an end to the systematic electoral fraud that had been practiced in Argentina between 1932 and 1943. There was no militarization of society, nor was public spending directed toward a massive arms buildup. Economic policy was dirigisme, but if state, planning is an indicator of fascism, one would have to conclude that Mexico under Cardenas and Great Britain under the Labour governments were also Fascist states. The Peronist governments of 1946-1955 and 1973-1976 directed their efforts toward distributive and industrializing policies.

According to Pablo Bradbury, while there was a great divergence between formal Peronist ideology and the wider Peronist movement, the ideology of Perón was not fascist; Bradbury argues that nationalism of Peronism was not rooted in a sense of expansion or imperialist greatness, but was left-wing nationalism that "found its most prominent expressions in anti-imperialism, whether against British economic dominance or US political interference." He also remarked that "Peronism originated in a military dictatorship, but established a populist authoritarian democracy". The democratizing movement within Peronism was significant, as it empowered previously marginalized groups - Peronism introduced universal suffrage and reshaped the definition of Argentinian citizenship and national identity. Bradbury also points to the racist rhetoric of middle-class and upper-class opponents of Peronism, who called Peronists cabecitas negras ("little black heads"), portraying the Peronist masses as prone to criminality, unsophisticated, dark-skinned and of immigrant background. Michael Goebel likewise points to the inclusive character of Peronism that conflicted with the exclusive nature of fascism - non-Spanish surnames were far more prevalent amongst the Peronist leadership than among any other political movement in Argentina, and "even in the more marginal provinces, Peronist politicians often had rather recent immigrant origins." Cas Mudde stated that "it is not an exaggeration to state that [Perón's] populism in general propelled democracy forward, both by encouraging democratic behavior and by enrolling lower class groups and their quest for social justice in political life."

Goran Petrovic Lotina and Théo Aiolfi wrote that "Peronism was never a form of fascism during Juan Perón's first presidencies (1946-55). Nor was Peronism fascistic in its subsequent incarnations over the past seventy-five years from the 1970s revolutionary leftist Montonero guerilla organization to the neoliberal centre-right presidency of Carlos Menem."

==== Class consciousness ====
Marxist and socialist critics of Peronism presented the movement as fuelled by migrant, recently arrived "new working class" that held traditionalist social views and was vulnerable to "authoritarian paternalism" of Perón. In this view, Peronism disempowered the 'old', socialist-aligned and established working class in Argentina by mobilizing "new arrivals" who flocked to Perón "without a clear consciousness of their class interests". Such view was espoused by writers such as Samuel Baily, who wrote that in Argentina, "the internal migrants and the organised workers viewed each other with hostility and suspicion"; according to Baily, Perón exploited this division by building his political base on 'class-unconscious' migrants who felt isolated by the established working class. Post-Marxist Ernesto Laclau also supported this view, accusing Perón of preying on the 'irrationality' of internal migrants and describing Peronism as "left-wing fascism". Socialist writers Timothy F. Harding and Hobart A. Spalding likewise accused Peronism of preventing the rise of revolutionary and militant tendencies amongst the Argentinian working class by infusing it with "false consciousness".

However, validity of this perspective has been challenged by sociologists and historians such as Ronaldo Munck or Ricardo Falcón. Analysing the demographics of Peronist support, sociologists Miguel Murmis and Juan Carlos Portantiero found that "the organisations and leaders of the 'old' working class participated intensely in the rise of Peronism" and argued that the participation of the Argentinian working class in the Peronist movement was not "passive, short sighted or divided". Historian Walter Little disputed the significance of the division between "old" and "new" working class in Argentina, writing: "Far from being divided, the working class was remarkably homogeneous and explanations of popular support for Peronism must be developed on this basis."

Analysing the support of the trade union movement for Peronism, Munck and Falcón wrote: "Perón achieved the support of trade union leaders from the dissident socialists of the CGT No. 1, some of the major unions of the orthodox CGT No. 2, and in particular from the autonomous or independent unions, not forgetting the remnants of the syndicalist USA which had favoured this type of alliance since the 1935 split. Support from the leadership was matched by support from the rank and file." Regarding class consciousness, sociologist Susan B. Tiano wrote that in the Harvard Project, a survey of working-class attitudes in Argentina during the 1960s, Peronism was found to be "a major consciousness-increasing force among Argentine workers." Likewise, Munck and Falcón conclude that "Peronism can be seen as an overall consciousness-raising factor, and the ideological cement for the cohesive and solidaristic social structures of the Argentine working class."

== Peronism after Perón ==
=== Fall of Perón ===
A military and civilian coup, the Revolución Libertadora, led by General Eduardo Lonardi, overthrew the Perón government in 1955. During the coup, Lonardi drew analogies between Perón and Juan Manuel de Rosas. Lonardi used the quote "neither victors nor vanquished" (Spanish: ni vencedores ni vencidos), which was used by Justo José de Urquiza after deposing Rosas in the battle of Caseros. The official perspective was that Perón was "the second tyranny", the first one being Rosas; and that both ones should be equally rejected and conversely both governments that ousted them should be praised. For this end, they draw the line of historical continuity "May – Caseros – Libertadora", matching the coup with the May Revolution and the defeat of Rosas. This approach backfired. Perón was highly popular and the military coup unpopular, so Peronists embraced the comparison established between Rosas and Perón, but viewing him with a positive light instead. Nationalist historians draw then their own line of historical continuity "San Martín – Rosas – Perón".

The absence of Perón, who lived for 16 years in exile in Francoist Spain, is an important key to understanding Peronism. After he went into exile, he could be invoked by a variety of Argentine sectors opposed to the current state of affairs. In particular, the personality cult of Eva Perón was conserved by supporters while despised by the "national bourgeoisie". In the 1960s, John William Cooke's writings became an important source of left-wing revolutionary Peronism. Left-wing Peronism was represented by many organizations, from the Montoneros and the Fuerzas Armadas Peronistas to the Peronist Youth, the Frente Revolucionario Peronista and the Revolutionary Peronist Youth, passing by Peronismo en Lucha or Peronismo de Base.

On the other hand, older Peronists formed the base of the orthodox bureaucracy, represented by the Unión Obrera Metalúrgica (Augusto Vandor, famous for his 1965 slogan "For a Peronism without Perón" and declaring as well that "to save Perón, one has to be against Perón", or José Ignacio Rucci). Another current was formed by the "62 Organizaciones 'De pie junto a Perón'", led by José Alonso and opposed to the right-wing Peronist unionist movement. In the early 1970s, left-wing Peronism rejected liberal democracy and political pluralism as the mask of bourgeois domination. The anti-communist right-wing Peronism also rejected it in the name of corporatism, claiming to return to a "Christian and humanist, popular, national socialism".

=== Perón restored ===
By 1970, many groups from opposite sides of the political spectrum had come to support Perón, from the left-wing and Catholic Montoneros to the fascist-leaning and strongly antisemitic Tacuara Nationalist Movement, one of Argentina's first guerrilla movements. In March 1973, Héctor José Cámpora, who had been named as Perón's personal delegate, was elected President of Argentina, paving the way for the return of Perón from Spain. A few months after Perón's return and the subsequent Ezeiza massacre during which the Peronist Left and Right violently clashed, new elections were held in September with Perón elected president and his third wife Isabel vice president.

José Cámpora, a left-wing Peronist, had been replaced temporarily by interim President Raúl Alberto Lastiri. Though up to 1972 Perón staunchly supported Tendencia Revolucionaria embodied by Peronist youth organisations and the Montoneros, the trade union movement that was the largest Peronist faction felt marginalized, and their growing bitterness towards Perón threatened the stability of the movement. Because of this, when he became president again, Perón made significant concessions to Argentinian trade unions, which in turn "threw their considerable financial and organisational resources behind Perón". This led to marginalization of the Peronist Left, who was "driven into sullen compliance or into clandestine opposition". Constant skirmishes between revolutionary Peronists and Peronist trade unions took place between 1973 and 1974 - Montoneros would assassinate trade union leaders, whereas the trade union bureaucracy used its growing power within the administration to expel hostile parts of Peronist Left, as signified by José Rucci, CGT leader, stating that 'there will be no more messing around'. On 1 October 1973, Senator Humberto Martiarena, who was the national secretary of the Superior Council of the National Justicialist Movement, publicized a document giving directives to confront "subversives, terrorist and Marxist groups" which had allegedly initiated a "war" inside the Peronist organizations. From then on, the Superior Council took a firm grip on the Peronist organizations to expel the Left from it. Lester A. Sobel argues that in regards to his conflict with the Montoneros, "Perón was less opposed to socialism than to the rifts within his movement, caused in part by antagonism between Marxists and non-Marxists".

On that same day, a meeting took place among President Raúl Lastiri, Interior Minister Benito Llambí, Social Welfare Minister José López Rega, general secretary of the Presidency José Humberto Martiarena and various provincial governors, which has been alleged to have been the foundational act of the Argentine Anticommunist Alliance, orthodox peronist and death squad.

Perón's health was failing throughout his third and final term, which ended abruptly with his death and the succession of his wife to the presidency on 1 July 1974, but she was ousted by the military in another coup d'état in 1976, paving the way for the ensuing dictatorship's "National Reorganization Process" and the subsequent "Dirty War" against everyone deemed subversive, especially leftists, including left-wing Peronists.

=== Menem years ===
The official Peronist party is the Justicialist Party (PJ), which was the only Peronist party for a long time. During the government of Carlos Menem, a group of legislators led by Carlos Álvarez known as the "Group of 8" left the party, claiming that the government was not following Peronist doctrines. They created a new party, the Broad Front.

A short time later, José Octavio Bordón left the PJ as well, fearing that he might lose a primary election against Menem and thus he created his own party to take part in the 1995 elections and allied with Álvarez' Broad Front in the Front for a Country in Solidarity (Frepaso) coalition. Similar breakaway movements followed frequently after that, creating many small parties which were led by single politicians claiming to be the authentic inheritors of Peronism.

=== Kirchnerism ===
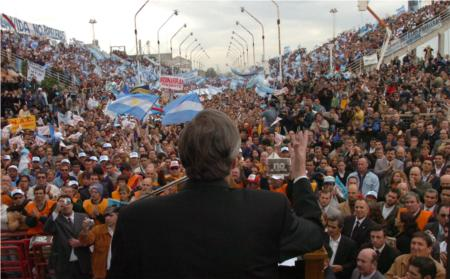
Néstor Kirchner addressing a multitude at Gualeguaychú

The PJ did not participate as such during the 2003 elections. The party allowed all three precandidates to run for the general elections, using small parties created for that purpose. Néstor Kirchner won the elections running on a Front for Victory ticket. As he did not disband his party after the election, Kirchnerism relies on both the PJ and the Front for Victory.

== See also ==
- Argentine nationalism
- Justicialist Party
- Labour Party (Argentina)
- Operation Condor
- Third World socialism
- History of Argentina (1946-1955)

=== Similar ideologies ===
- Kirchnerism
- Menemism
- Chavismo
- Chiangism
- Dutertismo
- Francoism
- Kemalism
- Marhaenism
- Nasserism
- Pinochetism

== Bibliography ==
- Gansley-Ortiz, Antonio Luis (2018). Perón and the Argentine Paradox: An Investigation into an Economic Mystery (Senior Projects (B.A.)). Vol. 306. Annandale-on-Hudson, NY: Bard College Digital Commons. p. 25. "Regardless, Peronism is universally agreed upon to be a left wing populism which tends towards the authoritarian, especially during the latter half of Perón's first presidency. Unlike the right wing ideologies of Mussolini and Franco, Peronism relied heavily on unions and the working class."
- Daniel James, Resistance and Integration: Peronism and the Argentine Working Class, 1946–1979. New York: Cambridge University Press, 1988.
- Félix Luna, Perón y Su Tiempo, Vol. I–III.: Sudamericana, 1990.
- Tomas Eloy Martinez, El Sueño Argentino (The Argentine Dream, 1999) and Memorias del General (Memoirs of the General, 1996).
