= Daniel James (historian) =

British historian

- Born: August 8, 1948 (age 78); Shepperton, England

Education
- Education: London School of Economics; Oxford University

Philosophical work
- Institutions: Indiana University; Duke University; Yale University; Cambridge University
- Main interests: Peronism

Daniel James (born August 8, 1948) is a British historian educated at Oxford University and the London School of Economics, where he received his doctorate in 1979. He is a scholar of Peronism and the working class in Argentina, as well as aspects of Latin American women's history.

James was born in Shepperton, England, a suburb of London. He is the son of Morgan and Claribel James. His father was a factory worker and World War II veteran who fought for the Allied Forces as a member of the Welsh Guard in the British Army. He was captured by Nazi forces and imprisoned in Poland before being freed by Russian forces toward the end of the conflict. His mother was a long-time operator at Shepperton Studios.

He has taught at Cambridge University, Yale and Duke University. Since 1999 he has occupied the Bernardo Mendel Chair in Latin American History at Indiana University. For his lifelong work, James was the recipient of a 2006 Guggenheim fellowship.

== List of works ==
- Resistance and Integration: Peronism and the Argentine Working Class, 1946-1979. Cambridge: Cambridge University Press, 1988.
- The Gendered Worlds of Latin American Women Workers: From Household and Factory to the Union Hall and Ballot Box. Durham, NC: Duke University Press, 1997. (Co-editor with John French)
- Doña María's Story: Life History, Memory, and Political Identity. Durham, NC: Duke University Press, 2000.
