= Michael Goebel =

German historian (born 1976)

Michael Goebel (born 1976) is a German historian. Since 2021, he has been Einstein Professor of Global History at Freie Universität Berlin.

== Biography ==
Born in Munich, Goebel studied History at Freie Universität Berlin and University College London, where he received his Ph.D. in 2006. He subsequently held a Past & Present Fellowship at the Institute of Historical Research, a Marie Curie Fellowship at the European University Institute, and a John F. Kennedy Memorial Fellowship at Harvard University. After four years as "Wissenschaftlicher Mitarbeiter", Freie Universität Berlin appointed him as a professor in June 2015. In 2018 he became the holder of the Pierre du Bois Chair Europe and the World at the Graduate Institute of International and Development Studies in Geneva. He is one of the founders of the Global Urban History blog and a member of the Graduate School Global Intellectual History at Freie Universität Berlin.

Goebel's main research interests are the histories of nationalism, of migration, and of cities. Trained in the intellectual history of Latin America, his first book dealt with nationalism and the political use of history in twentieth-century Argentina. However, his second book, Anti-Imperial Metropolis: Interwar Paris and the Seeds of Third World Nationalism, deals with the urban history of Paris as the “‘social bedrock’ for the formation of an anti-imperialist consciousness that transformed the world after 1945.” The book won the 2016 Jerry Bentley Prize in World History, awarded by the American Historical Association. Even though the book champions the benefits of “global history,” Goebel elsewhere warned that an “over-endearment with phenomena and historical explanations that cross national, and now regional, boundaries (…) can lead to unconvincing historical accounts, or narratives that drown questions of causality in a never-ending assemblage of sparkly anecdotes about ‘entanglement.’”

== Original works ==
- Anti-Imperial Metropolis: Interwar Paris and the Seeds of Third World Nationalism (Cambridge: Cambridge University Press, 2015).
- edited with Nicola Foote: Immigration and National Identities in Latin America (Gainesville: University Press of Florida, 2014).
- Overlapping Geographies of Belonging: Migrations, Regions, and Nations in the Western South Atlantic (Washington, DC: American Historical Association, 2013).
- La Argentina partida: nacionalismos y políticas de la historia (Buenos Aires: Prometeo, 2013).
- Argentina’s Partisan Past: Nationalism and the Politics of History (Liverpool: Liverpool University Press, 2011).
