= Donald C. Hodges =

American philosopher

Donald Clark Hodges (Fort Worth 1923-Climax, Georgia 2009) was a philosophy professor at Florida State University and a Marxist social scientist, who wrote about revolutions and revolutionaries (especially about southern and middle America).

Growing up in Buenos Aires, Argentina, Hodges returned to the US in 1941. He was a student of James Burnham, the author of "The Managerial Revolution," which argued that both in the Communist and the capitalist world the managers "rule the world." Hodges was a devoted Marxist and an organizer for the Communist Party and labor organizations as a young man. He inspired a local Students for a Democratic Society chapter in Florida.

Hodges earned his Doctor of Philosophy from Columbia University in 1954. He was a professor at University of Missouri, University of South Florida, as well as at Florida State University, where he began teaching in 1969. He retired from Florida State after 39 years. Hodges spent time in places like Uruguay where he met people like Abraham Guillen, an anarcho-syndicalist in the style of Bakunin. He lived more than 20 years in the Miccosukee Land Co-op. In 2003, at eighty years old, he published "Deep Republicanism: Prelude to Professionalism" in which he studied Cesare Borgia, a successful ruler, and everyone who felt inspired by Machiavelli: Jean-Jacques Rousseau, Robespierre, Babeuf, Filippo Buonarroti, Marx, Engels, Lenin, Trotsky, Stalin, Mao, George Orwell, Céline, Boris Yeltsin. Also for Hodges Il Principe is not Machiavelli's main work, but Il Discorsi.

According to one of his students Hodges "would track down original sources to see for himself if they were being cited correctly or taken out of their proper context." Some of the known contributions of Hodges to Marxist philosophy include his assertion that "the young Marx has become the hero of Marx scholarship and the late Engels its villain", and that Mikhail Bakunin was "the first anarcho-Marxist". He also extensively wrote on Marx's humanism, writing that Marxist contribution to humanism was "its addition of a material, bodily, passionate and sensuous content to traditional humanism and the elevation of this content to the status of liberal activity” and “its development of the social and humanitarian elements of traditional humanism”. He also postulated the existence of a "fourth major class" that he called "technocracy", which he defined as workers with organizational and technical expertise. He argued that this class was not exploited and therefore not proletarian.

Hodges also analyzed and defended movements and revolutions such as Peronism, the Mexican Revolution and the Sandinistas. He wrote that Peronism under Juan D. Perón was a "Christian and humanist version of socialism". He criticized "the conceptual rigidity" of most Marxist interpretations of the Mexican Revolution, while also dismissing non-Marxist interpretations of it as "vague and primitive". He argues that the Mexican Revolution was not a bourgeois revolution given that the revolutionary struggle also included "the peasantry, the rural and urban petty bourgeoisie, the rural and urban proletariat, and even the country's lumpenproletariat"; because of this, he recommends that it should be viewed as a "bureaucratic political revolution combined with an abortive peasant revolution". He concluded that the revolution resulted in a "Bonapartist" state, in which "the bourgeoisie remained the economically dominant class, but in order to save its purse it gave up the crown."

== Selected works ==
- Bakunin's Controversy with Marx: An Analysis of the Tensions within Modern Socialism (1960)
- Philosophy of Labor (1961)
- The Dual Character of Marxian Social Science (1962)
- Engels' Contribution to Marxism (1965)
- Marx's Concept of Value and Critique of Value Fetishism (1970)
- NLF: National Liberation Fronts, 1960–1970 (1972)
- The Latin American Revolution: Politics and Strategy from Apro-Marxism to Guevarism. W. Morrow, 1974, ISBN 0-688-00315-X
- Socialist Humanism: The Outcome of Classical European Morality (1974)
- The Legacy of Che Guevara: A Documentary Study. Thames and Hudson, 1977, ISBN 0-500-25056-1
- The Bureaucratization of Socialism (1981)
- Intellectual Foundations of the Nicaraguan Revolution (1986)
- Argentina, 1943-1987: The National Revolution and Resistance. University of New Mexico Press, 1988.
- The Literate Communist: 150 Years of the Communist Manifesto. (Major Concepts in Politics and Political Theory) (1991)
- Argentina's 'Dirty War': An Intellectual Biography (1991)
- Sandino's Communism: Spiritual Politics for the Twenty-First Century (1992)
- Mexican Anarchism After the Revolution (1995). University of Texas Press. p. 101. ISBN 0-292-73097-7.
- Class Politics in the Information Age (2000)
- with Ross Gandy (2001). Mexico, the End of the Revolution. Greenwood Publishing Group, 2002. ISBN 0-275-97330-1, ISBN 978-0-275-97330-8
- with Ross Gandy (2002). Mexico Under Siege: Popular Resistance to Presidential Despotism. Zed Books. pp. 25, 85–87, 107–115. ISBN 1-84277-125-6.
- Deep Republicanism: Prelude to Professionalism (2003)
- Mexican Anarchism After the Revolution (2010)
- Intellectual Foundations of the Nicaraguan Revolution (2014)
