= Raanan Rein =

Israeli historian (born 1960)

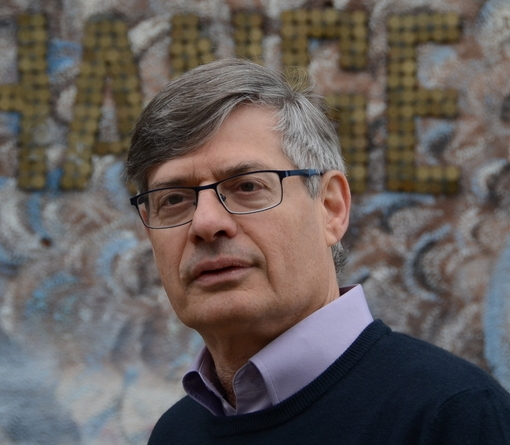
Rein in 2019

Raanan Rein (Hebrew: רענן ריין; 17 June 1960) is a History Professor at the University of Florida, Gainesville, and the Alexander Grass Chair in Jewish Studies. Previously, he was the Elías Sourasky Professor of Latin American and Spanish History and former Vice President of Tel Aviv University.[1] Between 2005-2023 Rein was the Head of the S. Daniel Abraham Center for International and Regional Studies.[2] He is a member of Argentina's National Academy of History,[2] and former President of the Latin American Jewish Studies Association (LAJSA). The Argentine government awarded him the title of Commander in the Order of the Liberator San Martín for his contribution to Argentine culture. The Spanish government awarded him the title of Commander in the Order of Civil Merit. His current research deals with Jewish Argentines and Peronism, sports and politics in Argentina, Jewish Self-Defense organizations, and Jewish volunteers in the Spanish Civil War.

== Early life ==
Rein was born in Givataim (Israel) where he grew up and attended "Shimom Ben Tzvi" High School. He is married to Mónica Esti Rein and father of two children. During the 1980s he held several positions in the Israeli press and media, among them: Foreign News Editor of the I.D.F. Radio Station, Commentator on foreign affairs in Al Hamishmar, Member of the founding group of Hadashot daily newspaper and its first Foreign News Editor. During this period he published hundreds of articles and reportages in a number of Israeli newspapers and magazines.

== Academic life ==
While working as a journalist, Rein completed his academic studies at Tel Aviv University. He graduated from Tel Aviv University in 1986 with a B.A degree in Political Science and History. His doctoral dissertation, supervised by Profs. Shlomo Ben-Ami and Tzvi Medin, dealt with the Franco-Perón Alliance and Spanish-Argentine relations after World War II. In 1992, after receiving a Ph.D in history, he joined the Department of History as Lecturer and in 2001 he was promoted to the rank of Full Professor in this Department. Several years later he became the Elías Sourasky Professor of Latin American and Spanish History.

In addition to his extensive academic work, Rein has also held administrative positions at the university. He was a Member of the Board of Directors of Tel Aviv University; served as the Director of the Sverdlin Institute for Latin American History and Culture; Chairperson of the Faculty of Humanities Teaching Committee (2003 to 2005); Founding director of the S. Daniel Abraham Center for International and Regional Studies beginning in 2004; and Vice Rector of the University (2005-2009). He was also a Member of the International Committee, appointed by the Spanish Ministry of Education, Culture, and Sport, to evaluate centers of excellence in Spanish Universities. Between the years 2012-2021, Rein served as Tel Aviv University’s Vice President for Global Engagement.

Rein is also the co-editor of the journal Estudios Interdisciplinarios de América Latina y el Caribe, editor of the book series in Spanish Nuevas miradas a la Argentina del siglo XX published by Lumière in Buenos Aires, Argentina, and editor of Brill's book series Jewish Latin America: Issues and Methods. Rein is on the editorial board of seven academic journals and was the guest editor of several special issues in various journals, including History & Memory, Z'manin, Mediterranean Historical Review, and Jewish History. Rein was a visiting professor at the University of Maryland, College Park, Emory University, Atlanta, and UADE in Buenos Aires.

== Grants, Honors and Prizes ==
Rein, over the years, has won numerous awards. He was the first Israeli to be elected to the National Academy of History of Argentina. In May 2009 Rein was awarded the title of Commander in the Order of the Liberator San Martín by the Argentine Government for his contribution to Argentine culture. In 2012, he won the Bi-Annual Award of the Center of the Iberian and Latin American Communities in Israel (CICLA) for contributing to a better understanding of Latin America in Israel. In the following year he was awarded the Latin American Jewish Studies Association (LAJSA) Book Prize for the co-edited volume (with Adriana Brodsky), The New Jewish Argentina: Facets of Jewish Experiences in the Southern Cone. In 2014, he won the “Dorothy and Elmer Kirsch Distinguished Conference Scholar” from Hofstra University. In 2016, he won the Reimar Lüst Award (co-sponsored by the Alexander von Humboldt Foundation and the Fritz Thyssen Foundation); Awarded the title of Comendador in Spain's Order of Civil Merit, granted by King Felipe VI; Awarded the title Huesped de Honor Extraordinario by the President of the Universidad Nacional de La Plata, Argentina; Awarded the Seal of the Bicentenary by the Ente del Bicentenario, Tucumán. In March 2017, the City of Buenos Aires declared him as a Guest of Honor. In May 2017 The Argentine University of San Martin (UNSAM) conferred upon him an Honorary Doctorate.In January 2020, awarded the title Ufficiale dell'Ordine della Stella d'Italia by the Italian government for his contribution to the promotion of academic relations and cooperation between Italy and Israel.

== Research ==
Among his research interests are Modern Latin America, populist movements, Argentine society and politics, Jews in the Spanish speaking world, ethnic minorities in Latin America, immigration and collective identities, 20th century Spain. His current research deals with Jewish Argentines and Peronism, sports and politics in Argentina, Jewish Self-Defense organizations, and Jewish volunteers in the Spanish Civil War.

Among his prominent research:

- The Franco-Perón Alliance: Relations between Spain and Argentina, 1946-1955, University of Pittsburgh Press, Pittsburgh and London, 1993.
- Argentina, Israel, and the Jews: Perón, the Eichmann Capture, and After, University Press of Maryland, 2003.
- In the Shadow of Perón: Juan Atilio Bramuglia and the Second Line of Argentina's Populist Movement, Stanford University Press, 2008.
- Argentine Jews or Jewish Argentines? Essays on Ethnicity, Identity, and Diaspora, Brill, 2010.
- Fútbol, Jews, and the Making of Argentina, Stanford University Press, 2015.

== Publications ==
Rein is the author and editor of more than fifty books and well over a hundred and fifty articles in academic journals and book chapters, in several languages.

Among his publications:

=== Books ===
- Raanan Rein and Ariel Noyjovich, Peronism as a Big Tent: The Political Inclusion of Arab Immigrants in Argentina, McGill-Queen's University Press, 2022.
- Raanan Rein, Jewish Self Defense in South America: Facing Anti-Semitism with a Club in Hand, New York: Routledge, 2022.
- Adriana Brodsky and Raanan Rein (eds.). The New Jewish Argentina: Facets of Jewish Experiences in the Southern Cone. Boston, MA: Brill, 2013.
- Raanan Rein, Populism and Ethnicity: Peronism and the Jews of Argentina, McGill-Queen's University Press, 2020.
- David Sheinin and Raanan Rein (eds.). Muscling in on New Worlds: Jews, Sport, and the Making of the Americas. Boston, MA: Brill, 2015.
- Jeffrey Lesser and Raanan Rein (eds.). Rethinking Jewish-Latin Americans. New Mexico: University of New Mexico Press, 2008.
- Rein, Raanan. Argentina, Israel and the Jews: Perón, the Eichmann Capture, and After. Bethesda, MD: University Press of Maryland, 2003.
- Rein, Raanan. Argentine Jews or Jewish Argentines? Essays on Ethnicity, Identity, and Diaspora. Boston, MA: Brill, 2010.
- Rein, Raanan (ed.). Árabes y judíos en Iberoamérica: similitudes, diferencias y tensiones sobre el trasfondo de las tres culturas. Madrid: Tres Culturas, 2008.
- Rein, Raanan. Fútbol, Jews, and the Making of Argentina. Stanford, CA: Stanford University Press, 2015.
- Rein, Raanan. In the Shadow of the Holocaust and the Inquisition: Israel's Relations with Francoist Spain. London and Portland, OR: Routledge, 1997.
- Rein, Raanan. In the Shadow of Perón: Juan Atilio Bramuglia and the Second Line of Argentina's Populist Movement. Stanford, CA: Stanford University Press 2008.
- Rein, Raanan. Peronismo, populismo y política: Argentina, 1943-1955. Buenos Aires: Editorial de la Universidad de Belgrano, 1998.
- Rein, Raanan. The Franco-Perón Alliance: Relations between Spain and Argentina, 1946-1955. Pittsburgh and London: University of Pittsburgh Press, 1993.

=== Articles ===
- Rein, Raanan.“The Meites Sisters and the Spanish Civil War: Women's Support for Republican Spain from Within and Without”, Journal of Modern Jewish Studies (2023). "Challenging the Argentine Melting Pot: Peronism, Hispanidad, and Cultural Diversity", Journal of Contemporary History (2022).
- Raanan Rein and Ilan Diner. "Unfounded Fears, Inflated Hopes, Passionate Memories: Jewish Self-Defense in 1960s Argentina", Journal of Modern Jewish Studies, Vol 11 No.3 (November 2012), pp. 357–376.
- Rein, Raanan. "A Belated Inclusion: Jewish Volunteers in the Spanish Civil War and Their Place in the Israeli National Narrative", Israel Studies, Vol. 17, No. 1 (Spring 2012): pp. 24–49.
- Rein, Raanan. “A Trans-National Struggle with National and Ethnic Goals: Jewish-Argentines and Solidarity with the Republicans during the Spanish Civil War”, Journal of Iberian and Latin American Studies, JILAR, Vol. 20, No. 2, 2014, pp. 171–182.
- Rein, Raanan. "Diplomacy, Propaganda, and Humanitarian Gestures: Francoist Spain and Egyptian Jews, 1956-1968", Iberoamericana, No. 23 (2006): pp. 21–33.
- Rein, Raanan. "Echoes of the Spanish Civil War in Palestine: Zionists, Communists and the Contemporary Press", Journal of Contemporary History, Vol. 43 No. 1 (2008): pp. 9–23.
- Rein, Raanan. "Football, Politics and Protests: The International Campaign against the 1978 World Cup in Argentina" in S. Rinke/K. Schiller (eds.), The Relevance and Impact of FIFA World Cups, 1930-2010, (Goettingen: Wallstein, 2014) pp. 240–258.
- Rein, Raanan. "From Juan Perón to Hugo Chávez and Back: Populism Reconsidered", in Mario Sznajder, Luis Roniger and Carlos Forment (eds.), Shifting Frontiers of Citizenship: The Latin American Experience, (Boston, MA: Brill, 2013) pp. 289–311.
- Rein, Raanan. “The Eichmann Kidnapping: Its Effects on Argentine-Israeli Relations and the Local Jewish Community”, Jewish Social Studies, Vol. 7, No. 3 (2001): pp. 101–130.
