= Federico Finchelstein =

Argentine historian

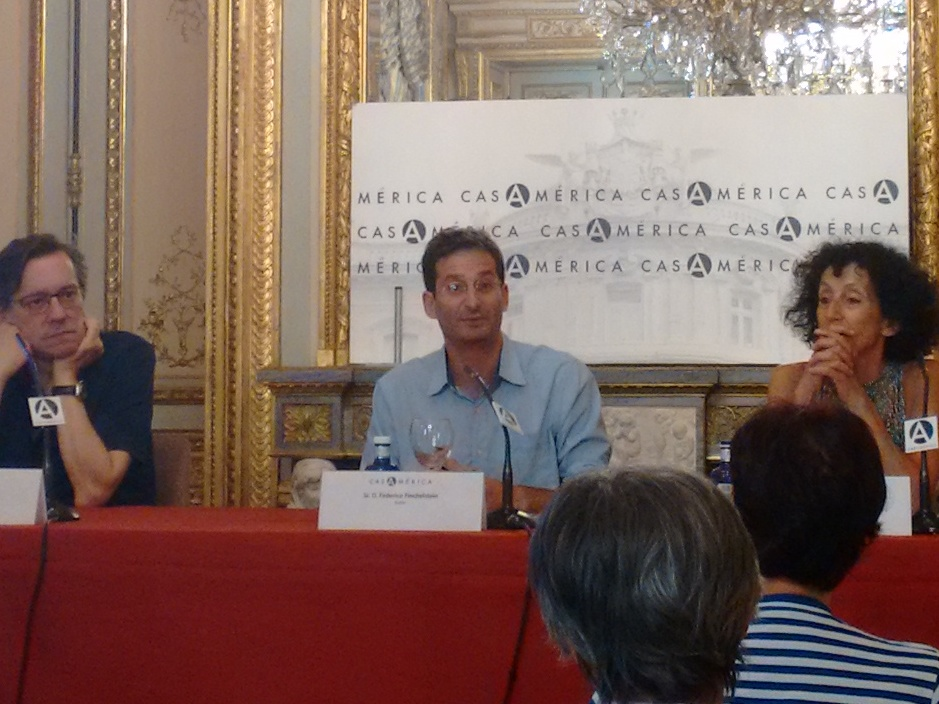
- Born: 1975 (age 50–51); Buenos Aires, Argentina

Academic background
- Education: Cornell University; University of Buenos Aires

Academic work
- Discipline: History
- Institutions: Brown University; The New School for Social Research
- Main interests: History of Argentina; Fascism
- Notable works: A Brief History of Fascist Lies

Federico Finchelstein is an Argentine historian and chair of the history department at the New School for Social Research and is director of the Janey Program in Latin American Studies.

After receiving his undergraduate education at the University of Buenos Aires, he received his Ph.D. from Cornell University in 2006. He has previously taught at Brown University.

Finchelstein is an expert on transatlantic Fascism and the modern history of Argentina. He has authored books on populism, Dirty Wars, the Holocaust and Jewish history in Latin America and Europe. He has been a commentator on politics in The Guardian and The New York Times, as well as other publications in Argentina and elsewhere.

== Recent books ==
- Transatlantic Fascism: Ideology, Violence and the Sacred in Argentina and Italy, 1919–1945 (2010)
- The Ideological Origins of the Dirty War: Fascism, Populism, and Dictatorship in Twentieth-Century Argentina (2014)
- From Fascism to Populism in History (2017)
- A Brief History of Fascist Lies (2020)
- Fascist Mythologies: The History and Politics of Unreason in Borges, Freud, and Schmitt (2022)
- The Wannabe Fascists: A Guide to Understanding the Greatest Threat to Democracy (2024)
