= Long delayed echo =

Anomalous radio echo

Long delayed echoes (LDEs) are radio echoes which return to the sender several seconds after a radio transmission has occurred. Delays of longer than 2.7 seconds are considered LDEs. LDEs are considered anomalous and have a number of proposed scientific origins.

== History ==
These echoes were first observed in 1927 by civil engineer and amateur radio operator Jørgen Hals from his home near Oslo, Norway. Hals had repeatedly observed an unexpected second radio echo with a significant time delay after the primary radio echo ended. Unable to account for this strange phenomenon, he wrote a letter to Norwegian physicist Carl Størmer, explaining the event:

At the end of the summer of 1927 I repeatedly heard signals from the Dutch short-wave transmitting station PCJJ at Eindhoven. At the same time as I heard these I also heard echoes. I heard the usual echo which goes round the Earth with an interval of about 1/7 of a second as well as a weaker echo about three seconds after the principal echo had gone. When the principal signal was especially strong, I suppose the amplitude for the last echo three seconds later, lay between 1/10 and 1/20 of the principal signal in strength. From where this echo comes I cannot say for the present, I can only confirm that I really heard it.

Physicist Balthasar van der Pol helped Hals and Stormer investigate the echoes, but due to the sporadic nature of the echo events and variations in time-delay, did not find a suitable explanation.

Long delayed echoes have been heard sporadically from the first observations in 1927 and up to the present day.

== Five hypotheses ==
Shlionskiy lists 15 possible explanations in two groups: reflections in outer space, and reflections within the Earth's magnetosphere. Vidmar and Crawford suggest five of them are the most likely. Sverre Holm, professor of signal processing at the University of Oslo details those five; in summary,

- Ducting in the Earth's magnetosphere and ionosphere at low HF frequencies (1–4 MHz). Some similarities with whistlers.

Signals may pass the ionosphere and then be conducted in the magnetosphere out to a distance of several Earth radii over to the opposite hemisphere where they will be reflected on top of the ionosphere. The round-trip time varies with the geomagnetic latitude of the transmitter and is typically in the 140–300 ms range. The further north the station, the larger the delay. Due to the short delay, this cannot be considered to be a real long-delayed echo. For completeness it is still included here.

Radio waves of frequency less than about 7 MHz can become trapped in magnetic field-aligned ionization ducts with L values (distance from the center of the Earth to the field line at the magnetic equator) less than about 4. These waves after being trapped can propagate to the opposite hemisphere where they become reflected in the topside ionosphere. They can return along the duct, leave it, and propagate to the receiver.

- Travel many times around the world. Signals can travel around the Earth seven times in one second. Such signals are also not uncommon.

"Goodacre reports that he pointed his antenna towards the horizon and received his own 28 MHz signal delayed by up to about 9 seconds.... His measurement implies travel up to 65 rounds around the earth." Probably the upper frequency limit for such effects.

The most popular current theory is that the radio signals are trapped between two ionized layers in the atmosphere and then are guided around the world many times over until they fall out of a gap in the bottom layer. (Ducting propagation between air layers in the lower atmosphere is a well-understood phenomenon. See Radio propagation.)

- Mode conversion: Signals couple to plasma waves in the upper ionosphere.

Investigated experimentally by Crawford et al., they recorded echoes with delays up to 40 seconds at 5–12 MHz.

The signals from two separated transmitters T1 and T2, T2 transmitting CW or quasi-CW signals, interact nonlinearly in the ionosphere or magnetosphere. If the wave vector and frequency of the forced oscillation at the difference frequency of the two signals satisfies the dispersion relation for electrostatic waves, such waves would exist and begin to propagate. This wave could grow in amplitude due to wave-particle interaction. At a later time it could interact with the CW signal and propagate to T1.

- Reflection from distant plasma clouds coming originally from the Sun.

Freyman did experiments at 9.9 MHz and detected several thousand echoes of delay up to 16 seconds at times when solar plasma probably entered the magnetosphere.

- Non-linearity in addition to mode conversion. Two transmitted signals combine to generate a difference frequency, which travels with a plasma wave, and then it is converted back.

It could explain amateur VHF/UHF echoes. Hans Rasmussen found echoes delayed by 4.6 seconds at 1296 MHz, and Yurek recorded a 5.75 second delay at 432 MHz.

== Alternative hypotheses ==
Some believe that the aurora activity that follows a solar storm is the source of LDEs.

Still others believe that LDEs are double EME (EMEME) reflections, i.e. the signal is reflected by the Moon and that reflected signal is reflected by the Earth back to the Moon and reflected again by the Moon back to the Earth.

When discussing the use of automated probes as a potential means of contact with extraterrestrial civilizations, American physicist Ronald Bracewell proposed that such probes might try to attract attention by sending back to us our own signals, citing the long delayed echoes as a possible case. This concept was expanded upon by Duncan Lunan, and also addressed by Holm.

== Deception ==
Volker Grassmann writing in VHF Communications noted the possibility of individuals hoaxing LDEs, saying, "Attempts at deception can in no case be ruled out, and it is to be feared that less serious radio amateurs contribute to deliberate falsification.... Short transmissions using different frequencies are a relatively simple procedure for excluding potential troublemakers." To reduce the possibilities of errors or hoaxes a worldwide logging system has been developed.

== See also ==
- Propagation mode
