= Leopold B. Felsen =

German-born American electrical engineer and physician

Leopold Benno Felsen
- Born: May 7, 1924; Munich, Weimar Republic
- Died: September 24, 2005 (aged 81); Boston, Massachusetts, U.S.
- Education: Polytechnic Institute of Brooklyn
- Awards: National Academy of Engineering membership (1977); IEEE Heinrich Hertz Medal (1991)
- Scientific career
- Fields: Electrical engineering; Acoustics
- Workplaces: Polytechnic Institute of Brooklyn; Boston University
- Thesis: Diffraction by Wedges and Cones (1952)
- Doctoral advisor: Nathan Marcuvitz

Leopold Benno Felsen (May 7, 1924 – September 24, 2005) was a German-born American electrical engineer and physicist known for his fundamental contributions to electromagnetism and wave-based disciplines. For the most of his career, he was a professor of Electrical Engineering at Polytechnic Institute of Brooklyn, which later became New York University Tandon School of Engineering.

== Biography ==
Leopold Benno Felsen was born on May 7, 1924, in Munich to Markus and Anna Felsen. He was of Polish-Jewish descent, with his father being a Polish citizen. His family was persecuted by the Nazi regime due to their ancestry; in 1940, he was sent to the United States by his family to live with a relative. While his parents survived and joined him in the United States in 1946, many of his family members including his elder sister Johanna died during the Holocaust.

He received his bachelor, master, and PhD degrees from the Polytechnic Institute of Brooklyn, in 1948, 1950, and 1952, respectively, all in electrical engineering. After his educations he became professor at Polytechnic Institute of Brooklyn and at Boston University College of Engineering, an IEEE life fellow and a fellow of both the Acoustical Society of America and the Optical Society of America.

In 1973, he coauthored with his PhD advisor Nathan Marcuvitz a textbook titled Radiation and Scattering of Waves which published by Prentice Hall in its Electrical Engineering Series. This was a classic worldwide textbook which immediately became widely used by researchers and has been described as "The Bible" in applied electromagnetism. Radiation and Scattering of Waves was reissued by IEEE in 1994 and 2003 as one of classic reissues in the collection of The IEEE Press Series on Electromagnetic Wave Theory.

Following his retirement from Polytechnic Institute of Brooklyn in 1994, Felsen relocated Boston to be near his family and accepted a faculty position at Boston University, teaching there until his death. From 1970s onward, he lived with muscular dystrophy. He died on September 24, 2005, in Boston, following complications from a surgery, and was survived by his two children and three grandchildren.

== Awards ==
In 1977, he was elected to the National Academy of Engineering "for his contributions to the theory and application of microwave propagation in complex media and for leadership in engineering education." In 1991 he won the IEEE Heinrich Hertz Medal.

== Publications ==
=== Authored ===
- Felsen LB, Marcuvitz N, Radiation and Scattering of Waves, Wiley-IEEE, 2003.
- Felsen LB, Mongiardo M, Russer P, Electromagnetic Field Computation by Network Methods, Springer, 2009. (Note: Published posthumously.)

=== Edited ===
- Bertoni HL, Carin L, Felsen LB, (Eds), Ultra-Wideband, Short-Pulse Electromagnetics, vol 1, Springer, 1993.
- Bertoni HL, Felsen LB, (Eds), Directions in Electromagnetic Wave Modeling, Springer, 1991.
- Carin L, Felsen LB, (Eds), Ultra-Wideband, Short-Pulse Electromagnetics, vol 2, Springer, 1995.
- Felsen LB, (Ed), Hybrid Formulation of Wave Propagation and Scattering, Martinus Nijhoff, 1984.
- Felsen LB, (Ed), Transient Electromagnetic Fields, Springer, 1976.
- Pinto IM, Galdi V, Felsen LB, (Eds), Electromagnetics in a Complex World: Challenges and Perspectives, Springer, 2004.

=== Tributed ===
- Russer P, Mongiardo M, (Eds), Fields, Networks, Computational Methods, and Systems in Modern Electrodynamics: A Tribute to Leopold B. Felsen, Springer, 2004.
- Sevgi L, Electromagnetic Modeling and Simulation, Wiley-IEEE, 2014.

== See also ==
- List of textbooks in electromagnetism
