= Interstellar Probe (1999) =

1999 NASA space probe concept

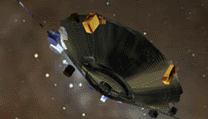
- Concept art for the proposed spacecraft, backdropped by stars
- Operator: NASA
- Applications: To travel out 200 AU in 15 years

Specifications
- Spacecraft type: Space probe
- Power: Solar sail

Dimensions
- Diameter: 400m

Capacity

Payload to {{{to}}}

Interstellar Probe is the name of a 1999 space probe concept by NASA intended to travel out 200 AU in 15 years. This 1999 study by Jet Propulsion Laboratory is noted for its circular 400-meter-diameter solar sail as a propulsion method (1 g/m^{2}) combined with a 0.25 AU flyby of the Sun to achieve higher solar light pressure, after which the sail is jettisoned at 5 AU distance from the Sun.

== Solar sail ==
Solar sails work by converting the energy in light into a momentum on the spacecraft, thus propelling the spacecraft. Felix Tisserand noted the effect of light pressure on comet tails in the 1800s.

The study by the NASA Jet Propulsion Laboratory proposed using a solar sail to accelerate a spacecraft to reach the interstellar medium. It was planned to reach as far as 200 AU within 10 years at a speed of 14 AU/year (about 70 km/s) and function up to 400+ AU. A critical technology for the mission is a large 1 g/m^{2} solar sail.

This great journey requires advanced propulsion, and the 200-kg Interstellar Probe is designed to use a 200-m radius solar sail to achieve a velocity of 14 AU/year. After exiting the heliosphere within a decade of launch, it would be capable of continuing on to ~400 AU. Interstellar Probe would serve as the first step in a more ambitious program to explore the outer solar system and nearby galactic neighborhood.

— Interstellar Probe, 1999

In the following years there were additional studies, including the Innovative Interstellar Explorer (published 2003), which focused on a design using RTGs powering an ion engine rather than a solar sail. Another project in this field for advanced spaceflight during this period was the Breakthrough Propulsion Physics Program which ran from 1996 through 2002.

Later examples of solar sail-propelled spacecraft include IKAROS, Nanosail-D2, and LightSail. Near-Earth Asteroid Scout is a planned light sail-propelled mission. For comparison, the LightSail spacecraft uses a sail 5 micron in thickness, whereas they predict a sail with 1 micron thickness would be needed for interstellar travel.

== Other design features ==
The probe would use an advanced radioisotope thermoelectric generator (RTG) for electrical power, Ka band radio for communication with Earth, a Delta 2 rocket for Earth launch, and a 25 kg instrument package using 20 watts.

== Objectives ==
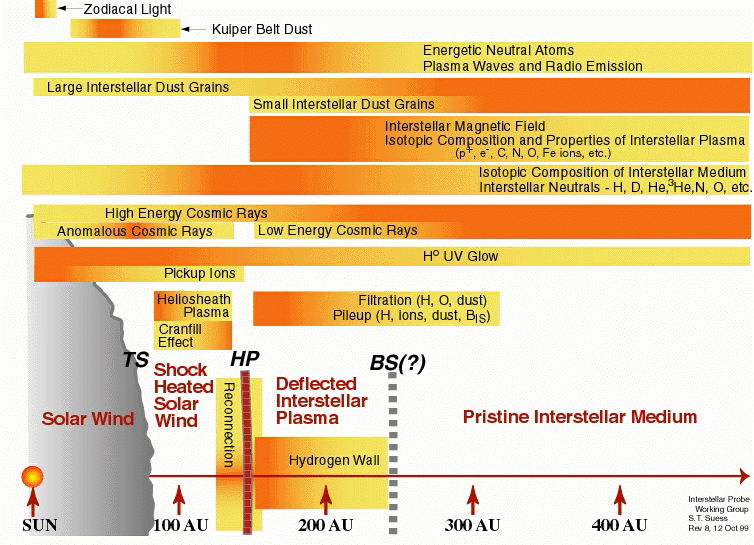
NASA produced diagram relating science goals to each region with regions farther from the Sun to the right. One AU is the distance from about the Sun to the Earth. Both Voyager 1 and 2 have passed 100 AU already. Yellow-orange color bar indicates the radial region where measurements are possible; the deepest orange is the prime region of interest.

== Historical view of region ==
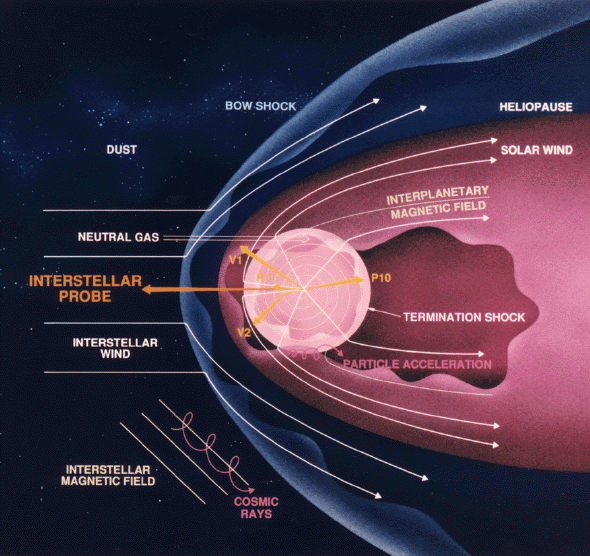
This is a look at the region the probe would fly through as it was predicted at the time

== See also ==
- Interstellar probe (generic)
- Breakthrough Starshot, a fleet of small light sail spacecraft
- Innovative Interstellar Explorer – NASA proposed space probe to 1000 AU from the Sun
- TAU (spacecraft) (1980s era interstellar precursor and astrometry probe)
- Stardust (spacecraft) (Believed to have collected some interstellar micro-dust)
- Interstellar Boundary Explorer (Space observatory that detects neutral atoms from beyond)
- Magsail – Proposed spacecraft propulsion method
