= Weber Research Institute =

Electromagnetics research group at NYU's Polytechnic Institute

The Weber Research Institute (known prior to 1985 as the Microwave Research Institute) is a research group at the Polytechnic Institute of New York University. The institute's research focuses on electromagnetics, including "electromagnetic, acoustic and lightwave propagation, scattering and detection, together with electromagnetic waves and the environment in communication and signaling systems."

== History ==
The Microwave Research Institute (MRI) was founded in 1945 by Ernst Weber at the Polytechnic Institute of Brooklyn (which later became the Polytechnic Institute of New York University). Research conducted at the institute included work in the areas of "electromagnetic theory, antennas and radiation, network theory and microwave networks, microwave components and devices." MRI was internationally regarded as one of the foremost centers of research on microwave field theory in the world. In 1985 it was renamed the Weber Research Institute in honor of its founder.

== Leadership ==
- Ernst Weber (1945-1956)
- Nathan Marcuvitz (1957-66)
- Arthur Oliner (1967-85)
- Erich E. Kunhardt (1986-90)

== Notable researchers ==
Among its most prominent members were Nathan Marcuvitz, Leo B. Felsen, Dante C. Youla and Arthur A. Oliner, all fellows of IEEE and members of the National Academy of Engineering. The institute has attracted researchers from all over the world, including Alexander Graham Bell Medal winner Tsuneo Nakahara, who in 1961 was a visiting research associate of the institute, and who went on to be vice chairman of the Sumitomo Electric Company, and Dr. Oguchi, who became chief engineer of Nippon Telegraph and Telephone. Another faculty member closely associated with MRI was KunMo Chung, Director of the Plasma Physics Laboratory from 1967 to 1975, who served as Minister of Science and Technology of South Korea two times and who was associated with numerous international science and technology agencies.

According to a 1968 inquiry by the journal MicroWaves, microwave engineers named by a wide margin the Polytechnic Institute as the school from which they had received their training.

== Publications ==
The institute held annual symposia on topics in the field of electronic and published 24 accompanying volumes, known as the MRI Symposium Proceedings.

MRI Symposium topics include:

1. Modern Network Synthesis (1952)
2. Nonlinear Circuit Analysis (1953)
3. Information Networks (April 1954)
4. Modern Advances in Microwave Techniques (November 1954)
5. Modern Network Synthesis II (1955)
6. Nonlinear Circuit Analysis II (1956)
7. The Role of Solid State Phenomena in Electric Circuits (1957)
8. Electronic Waveguides (1958)
9. Millimeter Waves (1959)
10. Active Networks and Feedback Systems (1960)
11. Electromagnetics and Fluid Dynamics of Gaseous Plasma (1961)
12. Mathematical Theory of Automata (1962)
13. Optical Masers (1963)
14. Quasi-Optics (1964)
15. System Theory (1965)
16. Generalized Networks (1966)
17. Modern Optics (1967)
18. Turbulence of Fluids and Plasma (1968)
19. Computer Processing of Communications (1969)
20. Submillimeter Waves (1970)
21. Computers and Automata (1971)
22. Computer-Communications Networks and Teletraffic (1972)
23. Optical and Acoustical Micro-Electronics (1974)
24. Computer Software Engineering (1976)
