= Astrochicken =

Astrophysical thought experiment by Freeman Dyson

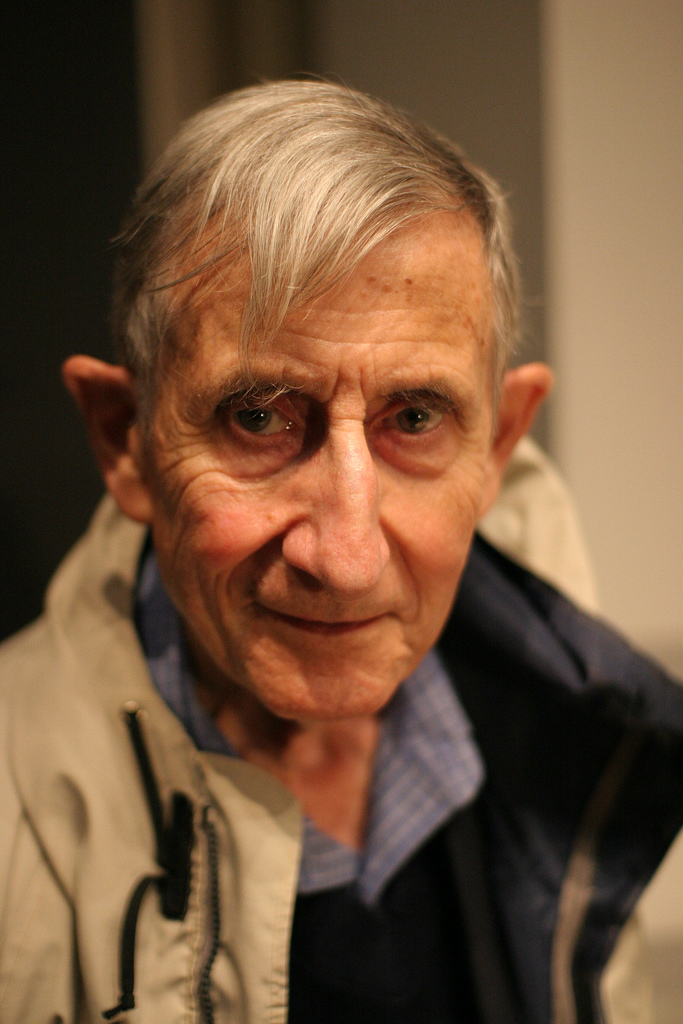
Freeman Dyson in 2005

Astrochicken is the name given to a thought experiment expounded by theoretical physicist Freeman Dyson. An Astrochicken is a small, one-kilogram spacecraft, a self-replicating automaton that could explore space more efficiently than a crewed craft could due to its innovative mix of technology.

== Description ==
In his book Disturbing the Universe (1979), Dyson contemplated how humanity could build a small, self-replicating automaton that could explore space more efficiently than a crewed craft could. He attributed the general idea to John von Neumann, based on a lecture von Neumann gave in 1948 titled The General and Logical Theory of Automata. Dyson expanded on von Neumann's automata theories and added a biological component to them.

Astrochicken, Dyson explained, would be a one-kilogram spacecraft unlike any before it. It would be a creation of the intersection of biology, artificial intelligence and modern microelectronics—a blend of organic and electronic components. Astrochicken would be launched by a conventional spacecraft into space, like an egg being laid into space. Astrochicken would then hatch and start growing a solar-energy collector. The solar collector would feed an ion drive engine that would power the craft. Once Astrochicken entered a planet's vicinity, it would collect material from the moons and rings of the planet, taking in nutrients. It could land and take off using an auxiliary chemical rocket similar to that used by bombardier beetles. It would periodically transmit details of its journey when it could make radio contact with Earth.

== History ==
The term "astrochicken" does not occur in Dyson's earliest essays regarding von Neumann-inspired automata. The concept was announced in a lecture Dyson was giving in Adelaide, Australia, on the subject of space exploration with biotechnology. An audience member called out "Oh, you mean this is an astro-chicken," and the whimsical name caught on, with Dyson beginning to use it himself in subsequent essays he wrote on his theoretical biotechnology spacecraft.

Today, Dyson's Astrochicken resonates with several theories of how space exploration might proceed in the future. Computer scientist Rodney Brooks has proposed sending a multitude of cheap, bug-like robots to explore Mars instead of solitary, expensive rovers. Cheaper and smaller means of studying space have also been the primary design philosophy of NASA for many years, perhaps best exemplified by the Mars Pathfinder mission. Physicist and noted author Michio Kaku wrote in his work Hyperspace, "Small, lightweight, and intelligent, Astrochicken is a versatile space probe that has a clear advantage over the bulky, exorbitantly expensive space missions of the past, which have been a bottleneck to space exploration. ... It will not need huge quantities of rocket fuel; it will be bred and programmed to 'eat' ice and hydrocarbons found in the rings surrounding the outer planets".

The Astrochicken is less well-known in the scientific and science fiction communities than Dyson's other theories, such as the Dyson sphere and the Dyson tree.

== See also ==
- Bioship
- Grey goo
- Intergalactic travel
- Interstellar travel
- Panspermia
- Self-replicating machine
- Space colonization
- Von Neumann probe
