= Waves in Random and Complex Media =

Scientific journal

- Discipline: Wave physics, electromagnetics
- Language: English
- Edited by: Francesco Zirilli, Saba Mudaliar

Publication details
- Former name: Waves in Random Media (1991—2004)
- History: 1991—present
- Publisher: Taylor & Francis
- Frequency: Bimonthly
- Impact factor: 4.051 (2022)

Standard abbreviations
- ISO 4: Waves Random Complex Media

Indexing
- ISSN: 1745-5030 (print); 1745-5049 (web)

Links
- Journal homepage; Online access; Online archive

Waves in Random and Complex Media is a peer-reviewed scientific journal published bimonthly by Taylor & Francis. It covers research in wave physics and electromagnetics, including propagation of classical and quantum waves, wave scattering, plasmonics and metamaterials. It was established under the name Waves in Random Media in 1991 and was previously published by IOP Publishing; it was renamed to its current title in 2004 after its acquisition by Taylor & Francis. Its founding editor-in-chief is Akira Ishimaru (University of Washington); Francesco Zirilli (Sapienza University of Rome) and Saba Mudaliar (Air Force Research Laboratory) serve as the current editors-in-chief.

== Abstracting and indexing ==
The journal is abstracted and indexed in:

- EBSCO
- Inspec
- zbMATH Open

The journal was delisted from Journal Citation Reports in 2023 due to editorial reasons; prior to its delisting, it had a 2022 impact factor of 4.051.
