= Akira Ishimaru =

Japanese-American electrical engineer (1928–2025)

- Born: March 16, 1928; Fukuoka, Japan
- Died: November 10, 2025 (aged 97); Newcastle, Washington, U.S.
- Education: University of Tokyo; University of Washington
- Known for: Wave scattering in random media
- Awards: IEEE Centennial Medal (1984); National Academy of Engineering membership (1996); IEEE Heinrich Hertz Medal (1999); IEEE Third Millennium Medal (2000)
- Scientific career
- Fields: Electrical engineering; Wave physics
- Workplaces: University of Washington; Bell Labs; Jet Propulsion Laboratory; Electrotechnical Laboratory
- Thesis: Radiation pattern synthesis with sources located on a conical surface (1958)
- Doctoral advisor: Gedaliah Held

Akira Ishimaru (Japanese: 石丸 昭; March 16, 1928 – November 10, 2025) was a Japanese-American electrical engineer and professor emeritus at Department of Electrical and Computer Engineering at University of Washington. He was best known for his contributions to the theory of wave scattering in random media.

== Life and career ==
Akira Ishimaru was born in Fukuoka, Japan, on March 16, 1928. He received his bachelor's degree from University of Tokyo and Ph.D. degree in electrical engineering from University of Washington, respectively in 1951 and 1958. During his doctoral studies, he was supervised by Gedaliah Held. From 1951 to 1952, he worked at Electrotechnical Laboratory in Tanashi, Tokyo. In 1956, he was employed at Bell Labs. In 1958, he joined the faculty of the Department of Electrical Engineering of the University of Washington, where he was also an adjunct professor of applied mathematics. He became a professor emeritus at the institution in 1999.

In 1996, Ishimaru was elected as a member of National Academy of Engineering "for his contributions to the theory and application of wave propagation and scattering in random media." Ishimaru was also the recipient of IEEE Centennial Medal (1984), IEEE Heinrich Hertz Medal (1999) and IEEE Third Millennium Medal (2000). He was a fellow of IEEE, the Optical Society of America, the Acoustical Society of America, and the Institute of Physics. He was the editor of Radio Science from 1979 to 1983, as well as the founding editor of the journal Waves in Random Media, later known as Waves in Random and Complex Media.

Ishimaru died in Newcastle, Washington, on November 10, 2025, at the age of 97.

== Research ==
Ishimaru's research mainly focused on wave propagation and scattering in random and turbulent media; his research contributed to advances in microwave remote sensing, ultrasound imaging, laser surgery, radar systems and astronomy, as well as Wireless and optical communications. His other research interests object detection and imaging in cluttered environments, inverse problems, wave propagation and scattering in the atmosphere and the terrain, acoustic scattering in the ocean and optical diffusion in tissues.Multiple scattering of waves is an important topic for several branches of physics including microwaves, optics, terahertz, acoustic waves and electron waves. Akira Ishimaru is credited with the first observation of photon localization as exhibited in backscattering enhancement. This is significant as the first optical demonstration of weak Anderson localization and is also noted as a major discovery in the Decade of Optics. This discovery was followed by a large number of publications on coherent backscattering in many engineering and science journals. Later he further demonstrated enhanced backscattering in random rough surfaces.

Ishimaru also authored two textbooks on advanced electromagnetics: Wave Propagation and Scattering in Random Media (1978) and Electromagnetic Wave Propagation, Radiation, and Scattering (1991).

== Selected publications ==
Books

- Ishimaru, A. (2017). Electromagnetic Wave Propagation, Radiation, and Scattering: From Fundamentals to Applications, 2nd ed, IEEE.
- Ishimaru, A. (1997). Wave Propagation and Scattering in Random Media, IEEE.

Journal articles

- Ishimaru, A. (1962). "Theory of unequally-spaced arrays". IRE Transactions on Antennas and Propagation. 10 (6): 691–702. Bibcode:1962ITAP...10..691I. doi:10.1109/TAP.1962.1137952.
- Reynolds, L.; Johnson, C.; Ishimaru, A. (1976). "Diffuse reflectance from a finite blood medium: applications to the modeling of fiber optic catheters". Applied Optics. 15 (9): 2059–2067. Bibcode:1976ApOpt..15.2059R. doi:10.1364/AO.15.002059. PMID 20165338.
- Ishimaru, A. (1977). "Theory and application of wave propagation and scattering in random media". Proceedings of the IEEE. 65 (7): 1030–1061. doi:10.1109/PROC.1977.10612. S2CID 21797465.
- Ishimaru, A. (1978). "Diffusion of a pulse in densely distributed scatterers". Journal of the Optical Society of America. 68 (8): 1045–1050. Bibcode:1978JOSA...68.1045I. doi:10.1364/JOSA.68.001045.
- Kuga, Y.; Ishimaru, A. (1984). "Retroreflectance from a dense distribution of spherical particles". Journal of the Optical Society of America A. 1 (8): 831–835. Bibcode:1984JOSAA...1..831K. doi:10.1364/JOSAA.1.000831.
- Tsang, L.; Ishimaru, A. (1984). "Backscattering enhancement of random discrete scatterers". Journal of the Optical Society of America A. 1 (8): 836–839. Bibcode:1984JOSAA...1..836T. doi:10.1364/JOSAA.1.000836.
- Jackson, D. R.; Winebrenner, D. P.; Ishimaru, A. (1986). "Application of the composite roughness model to high-frequency bottom backscattering". Journal of the Acoustical Society of America. 79 (5): 1940. Bibcode:1986ASAJ...79.1410J. doi:10.1121/1.393669.
- Ishimaru, A. (1989). "Diffusion of light in turbid material". Applied Optics. 28 (12): 2210–2215. Bibcode:1989ApOpt..28.2210I. doi:10.1364/AO.28.002210. PMID 20555501. S2CID 26198292.

== See also ==
- List of textbooks in electromagnetism
