= Erich E. Kunhardt =

- Born: Erich E. Kunhardt Grullón; 31 May 1949; Monte Cristi, Dominican Republic
- Died: 4 August 2014 (aged 65); New York, United States
- Occupation: Physicist
- Spouse: Christine Anne Kunhardt

Erich E. Kunhardt Grullon (May 31, 1949 – August 4, 2014) was a Dominican American physicist and electrical engineer who was Professor of applied physics at the Polytechnic Institute of New York University and a special advisor to the institute's president.

== Biography ==
Kunhardt was born in Monte Cristi, Dominican Republic, moving to the United States in 1956. Kunhardt held a Ph.D. in Electrophysics from the Polytechnic Institute of New York University and bachelor's and master's degrees from New York University. In 1992, he received an honorary doctorate from the Russian Academy of Sciences, Institute of Electrophysics. He is the recipient of numerous awards, including the Thomas A. Edison Patent Award and the Halliburton Foundation Excellence in Research Award. On October 10, 2006, he was appointed Provost by the Polytechnic Institute. Previously, he had served as the dean of the Arthur E. Imperatore School of Sciences and Arts and the George Meade Bond Professor of Physics at the Stevens Institute of Technology, where he had been a faculty member since 1992, and pioneered the establishment of its Plasma Physics Laboratory. He held the Polytechnic Provost position until March, 2009, when he returned to full-time research and teaching, and assumed the role of "invention, innovation, and entrepreneurship" advisor to the President and the new Provost.

At Stevens, Kunhardt proposed the concept of Technogenesis, which involves students, faculty and industry in the development and commercialization of new technologies. Kunhardt has worked on numerous research and development projects relating to particle and plasma physics. In 1999, Kunhardt helped create the PlasmaSol Corporation, based upon the Atmospheric Pressure Capillary Discharge Plasma technology he developed at Stevens with Dr. Kurt Becker. He was named a finalist by Discover magazine's Innovation Awards (2001) in the Environmental Category for the development of the PlasmaSol technology for environmental remediation. On December 30, 2005, PlasmaSol was acquired by the Stryker Corporation for $17.5 million.

On June 9, 2009, a symposium was held in Erich Kunhardt's honor.

In 1984, Kunhardt joined the faculty of the Polytechnic Institute of New York University for the first time, as a professor of electrophysics and physics and director of the Weber Research Institute. He arrived from the Texas Tech University, where he had been a professor of electrical engineering and physics and received the Outstanding Faculty Teaching Award.

Kunhardt died in New York on August 4, 2014, while he was a professor in the Department of Applied Physics of NYU Polytechnic School of Engineering.
