= Ernst Weber (engineer) =

Austria-American electrical engineer

- Born: September 6, 1901; Vienna, Austria
- Died: February 16, 1996 (aged 94); Columbus, North Carolina
- Citizenship: United States
- Known for: Pioneered microwave technologies, history New York University Tandon School of Engineering, first president of IEEE, co-founder NAE
- Awards: AIEE Education Medal (1960), IEEE Founders Medal (1971), National Medal of Science (1987)
- Scientific career
- Fields: Electrical Engineering
- Doctoral advisor: Felix Ehrenhaft
- Doctoral students: Nathan Marcuvitz

Ernst Weber (September 6, 1901 in Vienna, Austria – February 16, 1996 in Columbus, North Carolina), Austria-born American electrical engineer, was a pioneer in microwave technologies and played an important role in the history of the New York University Tandon School of Engineering, where in 1945 he founded the Microwave Research Institute (later renamed the Weber Research Institute in his honor). Weber was also the first president of the Institute of Electrical and Electronics Engineers (IEEE) and one of the founders of the U.S. National Academy of Engineering (NAE).

== Education and early years in Austria and Germany ==
Weber was born in Vienna, Austria. In 1924 he graduated with an engineering degree, and started working for the Siemens-Schuckert company as electrical engineer, initially in Vienna. In the meantime he studied further and earned two doctorates, a Ph.D. in 1926 from the University of Vienna and a Sc.D. in 1927 from the Technische Hochschule in Vienna (now TU Wien). Early 1929 he moved to Siemens-Schuckert headquarters in Berlin, Germany and started teaching at the Technische Hochschule in Charlottenburg (now Technische Universität Berlin).

== Awards and honors ==
Ernst Weber received several awards and honors, including:

- The U.S. President's Certificate of Merit from President Harry S. Truman in 1948
- The AIEE Education Medal in 1960, "for excellence as a teacher in science and electrical engineering, for creative contributions in research and development, for broad professional and administrative leadership and in all for a considerate approach to human relations"
- Eta Kappa Nu naming him an Eminent Member in 1962
- The IEEE Founders Medal in 1971, "for leadership in the advancement of the electrical and electronics engineering profession in the fields of education, engineering societies, industry and government"
- The Microwave Career Award from the IEEE Microwave Theory and Techniques Society in 1977
- The U.S. National Medal of Science from President Ronald Reagan in 1987
- To honor him, IEEE renamed in 1996 the IEEE Engineering Leadership Recognition Award to IEEE Ernst Weber Engineering Leadership Recognition.

== Books ==
Ernst Weber; Frederik Nebeker (1994). The Evolution of Electrical Engineering: A Personal Perspective. IEEE Press. ISBN 0-7803-1066-7.
