= Jenifer Haselgrove =

British physicist and computer scientist

Jenifer Leech (née Wheildon Brown; later Haselgrove; 3 August 1930 – 13 March 2015) was a British physicist and computer scientist. She is most noted for her formulation of ray tracing equations in a cold magneto-plasma, now widely known in the radio science community as Haselgrove's Equations.

== Haselgrove's equations ==
Haselgrove developed her equations at Cambridge University in the 1950s, as a student under Kenneth Budden, by re-applying the earlier work of William Rowan Hamilton and Hamilton's principle in geometrical optics to radio propagation in a plasma. Indeed, the application of Haselgrove's equations is often termed Hamiltonian ray tracing. Ray tracing is intrinsically an approximation that is often called geometric. It formulates as the Eikonal equation and is only applicable under certain conditions including that the plasma is slowly varying; nevertheless it has enormous practical use in radio science. Other radio propagation scientists have developed various techniques to explore radio propagation in such media, but Haselgrove's formulation has seen the most widespread application, most likely because the resulting set of differential equations readily lend themselves to numerical solution on a computer. Haselgrove herself used the Cambridge computer, EDSAC, to study ray propagation in the Earth's ionosphere in the late 1950s. Historically the best-known code applying Haselgrove's equations is the Jones-Stephenson code which was developed in the 1970s and may be found at the US Department of Commerce website.

Today Haselgrove's equations are widely used in scientific investigations involving radio propagation in slowly varying plasmas, and therefore have found much applicability in exploration and utilization of the Earth's ionosphere. Here they have also been used to represent the radio propagation element of practical systems providing high frequency communication, direction finding and over-the-horizon radar. For a recent broad discussion on ray tracing in the ionosphere see Bennett et al. Other publications applying Haselgrove's equations have recently appeared.

== Personal life ==
Haselgrove was married to British mathematician C. Brian Haselgrove and published several highly cited, technical articles with him, example; C. B. Haselgrove and Jenifer Haselgrove, Twisted Ray Paths in the Ionosphere, Proc. Phys. Soc. 75 No 3 (1 March 1960) 357–363. They are also credited for first solving the 6×10 Pentomino. Brian Haselgrove died in 1964, and Jenifer remarried to another British mathematician, John Leech, and took his surname. She worked at the University of Glasgow until 1982. She resided in England until her death on 13 March 2015.
