= IEEE Heinrich Hertz Medal =

The IEEE Heinrich Hertz Medal was a science award presented by the IEEE for outstanding achievements in the field of electromagnetic waves. The medal was named in honour of German physicist Heinrich Hertz, and was first proposed in 1986 by IEEE Region 8 (Germany) as a centennial recognition of Hertz's work on electromagnetic radiation theory from 1886 to 1891. The medal was first awarded in 1988, and was presented annually until 2001. It was officially discontinued in November 2009.

== Recipients ==
- 1988: Hans-Georg Unger (Technical University at Brunswick, Germany) for outstanding merits in radio-frequency science, particularly the theory of dielectric wave guides and their application in modern wide-band communication.
- 1989: Nathan Marcuvitz (Polytechnic University of New York, United States) for fundamental theoretical and experimental contributions to the engineering formulation of electromagnetic field theory.
- 1990: John D. Kraus (Ohio State University, United States) for pioneering work in radio astronomy and the development of the helical antenna and the corner reflector antenna.
- 1991: Leopold B. Felsen (Polytechnic University of New York, United States) for highly original and significant developments in the theories of propagation, diffraction and dispersion of electromagnetic waves.
- 1992: James R. Wait (University of Arizona, United States) for fundamental contributions to electromagnetic theory, to the study of propagation of Hertzian waves through the atmosphere, ionosphere and the Earth, and to their applications in communications, navigation and geophysical exploration.
- 1993: Kenneth Budden (Cavendish Laboratory, University of Cambridge, United Kingdom) for major original contributions to the theory of electromagnetic waves in ionized media with applications to terrestrial and space communications.
- 1994: Ronald N. Bracewell (Stanford University, United States) for pioneering work in antenna aperture synthesis and image reconstruction as applied to radioastronomy and to computer-assisted tomography.
- 1995: Jean van Bladel (Ghent University, Belgium) for major contributions in fundamental electromagnetic theory and its application to electrical engineering.
- 1996: Martin A. Uman (University of Florida, United States) for outstanding contributions to the understanding of lightning electromagnetics and its application to lightning detection and protection.
- 1997: Owen Storey (Stanford University, United States) for discovering the field-aligned paths of Hertzian-wave whistlers generated by lightning, thus discovering the Earth's magnetosphere.
- 1998: Chen-To Tai (University of Michigan, United States) for outstanding contributions to electromagnetic and antenna theory and the development and application of Green's dyadics.
- 1999: Akira Ishimaru (University of Washington, United States) or fundamental contributions to the theories and applications of wave propagation and scattering in random media and backscattering enhancement.
- 2000: Arthur A. Oliner (Polytechnic University of New York, United States) for contributions to the theory of guided waves and antennas.
- 2001: Adrianus de Hoop (Delft University of Technology, Netherlands) for fundamental contributions to the theory of reciprocity and to the understanding of electromagnetic wave propagation layered in media.

== See also ==
- List of physics awards
