= Martin A. Uman =

American engineer (born 1936)

Martin Allan Uman (born 1936) is an American engineer. He has been acknowledged by the American Geophysical Union as one of the world's leading authorities on lightning.

Uman is probably best known for his work in lightning modeling, which is the application of electromagnetic field theory to the description of various lightning processes. This provides a better understanding of lightning in general and has had a number of important practical spinoffs, the most notable has been a lightning locating system and the redefinition of several important lightning characteristics relative to hazard protection. Uman co-founded Lightning Location and Protection, Inc., a company in the lightning locating equipment business.

Uman has written five books on the subject of lightning, all of which are now in revised second edition paperbacks. He also is the author of a book on plasma physics and the co-author (with V. A. Rakov) of a book on lightning. Uman has written nineteen book chapters and encyclopedia articles on lightning, and he has published over 265 papers in reviewed journals and 342 in other articles and reports. He holds seven patents, six in the area of lightning detection and location.

== Early life and education ==
Uman graduated in 1953 as valedictorian from Henry B. Plant High School in Tampa, Florida.

He received his Bachelor of Science in Engineering from Princeton University in 1957 as a member of Phi Beta Kappa and Sigma Xi. He received his M.A. in 1959 and his Ph.D. in 1961 from Princeton in electrical engineering. His dissertation was "The Behavior of Electrons in Certain Gas Mixtures." In summer 1956 Uman was research assistant at Sandia Corporation in Albuquerque, New Mexico. In summer 1957 he was research associate at Sperry Gyroscope Company in Great Neck, New York. In summer 1958 he was research assistant at Forrestal Research Center in Princeton, New Jersey and scientist at Elcon Laboratory, Inc. in Cambridge, Massachusetts.

== Career ==
From 1961 to 1965 Uman was associate professor of electrical engineering at the University of Arizona in Tucson. At Arizona Uman taught and conducted research in electromagnetics and gaseous electronics and became interested in the physics of lightning.

From 1965 to 1971 Uman was fellow physicist at Westinghouse Research Labs in Pittsburgh. There he studied the physical and electromagnetic aspects of lightning and long laboratory sparks.

In 1971 Uman became a professor in the Department of Electrical and Computer Engineering at the University of Florida in Gainesville. He served as department chair from 1991 to 2003. In 2003 Uman was granted the rank of Distinguished Professor. He has been Director of the UF Lightning Research Laboratory since 1972.

In 1975 Uman co-founded Lightning Location and Protection, Inc. He served as president from 1975 to 1983 and as vice president and chief consulting scientist from 1983 to 1995, when he left the company. LLP is now a division of Vaisala and is the world leader in the sale of lightning locating equipment.

== Awards and honors ==
- 2018 - Lifetime Achievement Award "For your outstanding leadership and significant contributions to the lightning community. Your dedication, extensive scientific research, and educational instruction have inspired students and colleagues to achieve a better understanding of lightning electromagnetics, as well as lightning detection and protection around the world." Presented at the 25th International Lightning Detection Conference and the 7th International Lightning Meteorology Conference, 12–15 March 2018, Ft. Lauderdale, Florida
- 2010 - International Conference on Lightning Protection Karl Berger Award "for distinguished achievements in the science and engineering of lightning research, developing new fields in theory and practice, modeling and measurements." Presented by the Scientific Committee of the International Conference on Lightning Protection (ICLP), 30th International Conference on Lightning Protection ICLP 2010, Cagliari, Italy, 13–17 September 2010
- 2001 - American Geophysical Union John Adam Fleming Medal for "outstanding contribution to the description and understanding of electricity and magnetism of the earth and its atmosphere."
- 2001 - IEEE Power Engineering Society Surge Protective Devices Committee Prize Paper Award
- 1999 - IEEE Power Engineering Society Working Group Award for Standard or Guide
- 1998 - University of Florida, Professorial Excellence Program Award
- 1996 - IEEE Heinrich Hertz Medal, Gold for "...outstanding contributions to the understanding of lightning electromagnetics and its application to lightning detection and protection."
- 1994 - Industry Applications Society, Industrial and Power Systems Department, Ralph H. Lee Prize Paper Award.
- 1990 - Florida Academy of Sciences, Outstanding Florida Scientist, Gold Medal
- 1988 - Fellow, Institute of Electrical and Electronics Engineers
- 1988-89 - UF Teacher-Scholar of the Year (highest UF faculty award)
- 1982 - Electromagnetic Compatibility Society Transactions Prize Paper Award
- Fellow, American Meteorological Society
- Fellow, Institute of Electrical and Electronics Engineers
- Fellow, American Geophysical Union
- Who's Who in America

Other awards include NASA's 1992 and 1996 Group Achievement Awards to the Galileo Probe Spacecraft Team.
