= Bracewell probe =

Hypothetical space probe

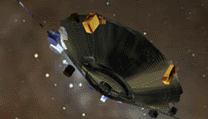
Artist's conception of an interstellar robotic probe

Proposed by Ronald N. Bracewell in 1960, a Bracewell probe is defined as a hypothetical autonomous interstellar space probe designed for communication with alien civilizations. It offers a potential solution to the inherent challenges of interstellar radio communication, such as signal delay, synchronization, and detection over vast distances.

== Description ==
A Bracewell probe is defined as an autonomous robotic interstellar space probe with advanced AI, pre-loaded with information or data its creators wish to convey. It would seek out existing technological civilizations or monitor worlds where such civilizations are likely to arise, establishing contact, making its presence known, conducting a dialogue over short distances (compared to interstellar distances), and transmitting the results of this interaction back to its origin. In essence, such probes would act as autonomous local representatives of their home civilization and serve as the point of contact between the cultures.

In contrast to radio communication across interstellar distances, a Bracewell probe offers key advantages: sustained presence in a target star system, active search capabilities, high-bandwidth local communication, and direct observation. Its physical presence serves as an unambiguous message. However, the probe cannot communicate information beyond its pre-loaded memory or update its contact protocols remotely. This inflexibility risks obsolescence and limits responses to unforeseen situations. Additionally, designing a Bracewell probe requires anticipating diverse alien biologies, psychologies, and technological levels — an inherently challenging task.

While a Bracewell probe does not need to be a von Neumann probe as well, the two concepts are compatible, and a self-replicating device as proposed by von Neumann would greatly speed up a Bracewell probe's search for alien civilizations.

It is also possible that such a probe (or system of probes if launched as a von Neumann–Bracewell probe) may outlive the civilization that created and launched it.

The search for Bracewell probes falls under SETA (Search for Extraterrestrial Artifacts) and SETV (Search for Extraterrestrial Visitation), encompassing efforts to detect evidence of extraterrestrial activity within the Solar System or nearby space. Detection methods might include searching for anomalous objects or emissions, analyzing long-delayed radio echoes (LDEs), and observing gravitational microlensing events. The LDE connection, however, remains highly speculative. These efforts often overlap with broader SETI initiatives, such as Breakthrough Listen.

The near-Earth object 1991 VG was initially considered a possible Bracewell probe due to its unusual rotation and orbit. However, subsequent observations identified it as a natural asteroid, with its characteristics attributed to the Yarkovsky effect and other non-gravitational forces.

== Variations ==
Bracewell's original 1960 paper proposed an autonomous probe for interstellar communication, but later researchers and science fiction writers have expanded on this idea.

=== Messenger probes ===
Following Bracewell’s original vision, these autonomous explorers carry pre-loaded messages and are designed to establish contact with technological civilizations.

=== Fly-through and rendezvous ===
Some are built for high-speed travel, gathering data during brief encounters before transmitting their findings home. Others are designed to decelerate and enter orbit, allowing for prolonged observation and near-real-time communication.

=== Non-replicating and self-replicating ===
While some remain singular, self-contained explorers, others incorporate von Neumann's concept of replication, enabling them to multiply and extend their search range exponentially.

=== Communicative and berserker ===
Certain probes act as peaceful electronic ambassadors, fostering interstellar dialogue. Speculative berserker machines, rooted in science fiction, are envisioned as autonomous weapons capable of eradicating alien civilizations.

== Fictional examples ==
- In Arthur C. Clarke's 1979 novel The Fountains of Paradise the extraterrestrial Starglider probe is an example of a Bracewell probe. In Clarke's 1951 story "The Sentinel", later adapted into the 1968 film 2001: A Space Odyssey, the 'Monolith' appears to be a Bracewell probe placed on the Moon to ensure that only a civilization capable of spaceflight would be able to discover it.
- Alien Planet is a 2005 94-minute Discovery Channel special about two internationally-built robot probes, and their mothership, searching for alien life on the fictional planet Darwin IV.
- Bracewell probes are featured in David Brin's 2012 novel Existence.
- In Star Trek: The Motion Picture (1979), a Voyager-class probe was upgraded and repurposed by an alien civilization. It acquired so much information, it became conscious and returned "home" to share what it learned.
- In the 1992 Star Trek: The Next Generation episode "The Inner Light", a Bracewell probe transmits details of an extinct civilization to Captain Picard.
- In the 2001 Star Trek: Voyager episode "Friendship One", the crew is tasked with recovering a Bracewell probe that humans launched and find it on a planet whose inhabitants used the knowledge they obtained from it with disastrous results.
- An alien probe contacts the space station Babylon 5 in the season 3 episode "A Day in the Strife". The probe disguises itself as a Bracewell probe, asking a series of questions and offering new technologies, medicine and science in return for answers to said questions. However, it's discovered that the probe was actually a berserker probe that would destroy any civilization that gave it correct answers by detonating an internal 500 megaton warhead.
- The Snark, an alien probe that visits Earth in the novel In the Ocean of Night (1977) by Gregory Benford.
- Bracewell probes in the role-playing game Eclipse Phase infect the seed AIs created by humanity with a deadly computer virus.
- In the 2010 Doctor Who episode "Victory of the Daleks", the Daleks create a Bracewell probe in the form of a convincingly human android (appropriately named Bracewell) and covertly send it to Earth during World War II in order to communicate a false cover story to humans that disguises the Daleks' own arrival.

== See also ==
- Astrobiology – Science concerned with life in the universe
- Breakthrough Initiatives – Science-based program founded in 2015
- Drake equation – Estimate of extraterrestrial civilizations
- Extraterrestrial life – Life that does not originate on Earth
- Fermi paradox – Discrepancy of the lack of evidence for alien life despite its apparent likelihood
- First contact (science fiction) – Science fiction theme about the first meeting between humans and extraterrestrial life
- Great Filter – Hypothesis of barriers to forming interstellar civilizations
- Interstellar communication – Communication between planetary systems
- Interstellar probe – Space probe that can travel out of the Solar System
- Kardashev scale – Measure of a civilization's evolution
- Project Daedalus – 1970s proposal for an interstellar probe
- Self-replicating spacecraft – Space exploration concept
- SETI Institute – Not-for-profit research organization
- Technosignature – Property that provides scientific evidence for the presence of technology
