= Nathan Marcuvitz =

American electrical engineer, physicist and educator

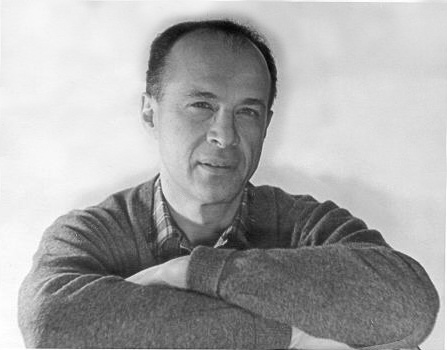
- Born: December 29, 1913; Brooklyn, New York, U.S.
- Died: February 14, 2010 (aged 96); Naples, Florida, U.S.
- Citizenship: U.S.
- Education: Polytechnic Institute of Brooklyn
- Awards: IEEE Heinrich Hertz Medal (1989)
- Scientific career
- Fields: Electrical engineering, applied physics
- Thesis: Wave guide circuit theory, coupling of wave guides by small apertures (1947)
- Doctoral advisor: Ernst Weber
- Doctoral students: Leopold B. Felsen

Nathan Marcuvitz (1913 – 2010) was an American electrical engineer, physicist, and educator who worked in the fields of microwave and electromagnetic field theory. He was head of the experimental group of the Radiation Laboratory (MIT). He was a member of the National Academy of Engineering. He had a PhD in electrical engineering from Polytechnic Institute of Brooklyn.

== Biography ==
Marcuvitz was born on December 29, 1913, in Brooklyn, New York.

Marcuvitz was a significant figure on the field of electromagnetic waves.

The crucial period in the development of the microwave field occurred during World War II, when the magnetron furnished a reliable source of electromagnetic waves and made radar feasible, but progress was initially slow because designs had employed empirical and cut-and-try procedures. What was needed were quantitative methods for characterizing the geometric structures involved and phrasing those methods in network terms. Marcuvitz headed the experimental group at the M.I.T. Radiation Laboratory, which was responsible for developing an accurate measurement set-up and a new measurement procedure for determining with great precision the network parameters of geometric discontinuities.

He also worked closely with the physicists and mathematicians responsible for the theoretical part of the systematic program, and showed them how to cast their solutions in engineering terms. As a result, the theoretical analyses were phrased in the network terms required for design, and the analytical results were compared with measurements under Marcuvitz' direction. Since Marcuvitz played the key role in coordinating the theoretical and experimental phases, he was asked to be the author of the Waveguide Handbook (1951), which became vol. 10 of the M.I.T. Radiation Laboratory Series.

Marcuvitz is best known as an extremely able microwave field theorist, rather than an experimentalist. This transition from experimentalist to theorist was made easier because of his close association with Julian Schwinger. Soon after his arrival in Cambridge, Massachusetts, Marcuvitz, together with Robert Marshak, who later became President of the City College of New York, rented a house near Harvard Square. Some of the rooms were rented to others who worked at the Radiation Laboratory, and Schwinger was one of those people. This arrangement lasted for only a year.

Schwinger worked during the night and slept all day. Marcuvitz would wake him up at 7:30 P.M., and they would go to dinner. After that they would often discuss their research problems until midnight, after which Marcuvitz would go home to bed and Schwinger would begin his work.

The Waveguide Handbook was one of his major contributions to the field.

Marcuvitz has also made many other significant contributions to electromagnetic waves. These include an explanation of the nature of leaky waves and how to calculate them, a new derivation for small aperture and small obstacle expressions, radial and spherical transmission line theories, new results for propagation through periodic structures, and so on. Some of these studies have been compiled into a comprehensive book, Radiation and Scattering of Waves (1973), coauthored with his former student, L. B. Felsen.

Most of the research projects were conducted under the aegis of the Microwave Research Institute (MRI). This institute became widely regarded internationally as the foremost research organization in the world in microwave field theory. For many years, it attracted post-doctoral researchers from around the world to spend a year or more, coming from such countries as Japan, France, U.S.S.R., Israel, Italy, England, Denmark, Sweden, Hungary, Poland, and Finland. Many of those researchers have since become famous in their own right. MRI was also well known for its series of annual symposia on topics in the forefront of the electronics field, and for the symposium proceedings volumes, 24 in all, that accompanied them.

Not only did MRI produce much important research in microwave field theory, but it also trained a whole generation of microwave engineers. The journal, MicroWaves, in an interview with many microwave engineers in 1968, asked them various questions, including from what school they received their microwave education. One of the article's conclusions was that more microwave engineers graduated from Brooklyn Polytechnic than from any other school, and that the second was M.I.T., with only half as many microwave graduates.

He died February 14, 2010, in Naples, Florida.

== Publications ==
He authored two classic graduate electromagnetic textbooks in electrical engineering literature. In 1951 he authored a textbook titled Waveguide Handbook as volume 10 of MIT Radiation Laboratory Book Series. This textbook summarizes the intensive and systematic research work related to field and network aspects of microwave problems which became a very influential textbook and has been described as "the most important and most widely used book in the history of the microwave field." John David Jackson also described the Waveguide Handbook as "[t]he definitive compendium of formulas and numerical results on discontinuities, junctions, etc., in waveguides" in his textbook Classical Electrodynamics. Waveguide Handbook reissued with errata by IEE in 1986, 1993, and 2009. In 1973 he coauthored with his PhD student Leopold Felsen another textbook titled Radiation and Scattering of Waves which published by Prentice Hall in its Electrical Engineering Series. This was another classic worldwide textbook which immediately became widely used by researchers and has been described as "The Bible" in applied electromagnetism. Radiation and Scattering of Waves was reissued by IEEE in 1994 and 2003 as one of classic reissues in the collection of The IEEE Press Series on Electromagnetic Wave Theory.

- Felsen LB, Marcuvitz N, Radiation and Scattering of Waves, Wiley-IEEE, 2003.
- Marcuvitz N, Waveguide Handbook, IEE, 2009.

== Selected honors and awards ==
Member, National Academy of Engineering, 1978
IEEE Fellow, Heinrich Hertz Medal (Gold Medal and Monetary Award, IEEE highest recognition for electromagnetic waves), (He was the first recipient, 1989)
Microwave Career Award from the IEEE Microwave Theory and Techniques Society in 1985

== Family ==
Son of Samuel and Rebecca M.(Feiner); Married Muriel Spanier, June 30, 1946; 2 children.

== See also ==
- List of textbooks in electromagnetism
- List of members of the National Academy of Engineering (Electronics)
