= Kenneth Budden =

British researcher (1915–2005)

Kenneth George Budden
- Born: 23 June 1915; Portsmouth
- Died: 4 September 2005 (aged 90)
- Education: University of Cambridge
- Scientific career
- Workplaces: University of Cambridge
- Doctoral advisor: J. A. Ratcliffe

Kenneth George Budden (23 June 1915 – 4 September 2005) was a British physicist with a research focus in plasma physics, best known for the publication of several textbooks on radio waves in the ionosphere. Budden was one of the first pioneers in computational physics, using EDSAC to find solutions of the Appleton–Hartree equation. He won the Gold Medal of the Royal Astronomical Society in 1999.

== Biography ==
=== Early life and education ===
Kenneth George Budden was born on 23 June 1915 in Portsmouth to George Easthope Budden and Hannah Gertrude Homer Rea. His father and grandfather had a naval background, and his mother was a pianist. In 1923, the family moved to Barrow-in-Furness, and returned to Portsmouth in 1926. Kenneth attended Portsmouth Grammar School. Kenneth went on to study Natural Sciences at St John's College, Cambridge in 1933, studying under scientists including G.F.C. Searle, John Cockcroft, Philip Ivor Dee, Charles Drummond Ellis and Mark Oliphant. He graduated with First Class honours in 1936, and moved on to a PhD working in the radio research group under J. A. Ratcliffe alongside Maurice Wilkes. Budden completed his thesis in 1939 or 1940.

=== The Second World War ===
On the outbreak of war, Budden was released from his upcoming job working for the British Coal Utilisation Research Association and joined the Air Ministry working on the development of radar, where he did the early research on heightfinding that would lead to Height finder radars and improve Ground-controlled interception. From 1941 to 1944 Budden was posted in Washington D.C. to assist with the development of radar in the United States. From 1944 Budden was posted to Kandy in Sri Lanka as the Director of Communications Development representative in South East Asia, with an honorary position as Squadron Leader in the Royal Air Force. Budden left service in 1945.

=== Scientific career ===
After the war, Budden joined a coal company called Delanium Ltd. as Director of Research, but left in 1947. He rejoined the University of Cambridge as a demonstrator, where he taught Abdus Salam. He became a fellow of St. John's College in 1947.

Budden moved towards more theoretical research. He was one of the early users of EDSAC, using computation to solve ionospheric problems (in particular the Appleton–Hartree equation), and was one of the first pioneers of computational physics. In 1957, he briefly worked at National Institute of Standards and Technology during a sabbatical. In the 1950s, Budden worked with computer scientist David W. Barron on early computing problems, and also worked with Jenifer Haselgrove on ray tracing in a cold plasma under a magnetic field, which he would expand upon into "complex ray tracing", using imaginary numbers in calculation. In 1961, Budden published his first major textbooks, Radio Waves in the Ionosphere and The Wave-guide mode theory of wave propagation. He worked at the Defence Research Telecommunications Establishment in 1963. In 1965, Budden was promoted to Reader in Physics.

During his career, Budden worked mostly in magnetoionic theory, in which he contributed extensively. In 1993, Budden received the IEEE Heinrich Hertz Medal for "major original contributions to the theory of electromagnetic waves in ionized media with applications to terrestrial and space communications." He worked mostly at the Cavendish Laboratory for the majority of his career.

Budden retired in September 1982. In 1985, he published his textbook The propagation of radio waves. He received the Gold Medal of the Royal Astronomical Society in 1999, with the citation mentioning his work on the propagation of radio waves in the ionosphere and his theory on the conversion of energy between different wave modes in a non-uniform magnetised plasma.

== Personal life ==
Budden married Nicolette Longsdon in 1947. The couple had no children. Budden was a devout Christian, and enjoyed gardening and beekeeping. Budden was a supporter of Portsmouth Football Club. He died on 4 September 2005 with Parkinson's disease.

== Awards ==
- Fellow of the Royal Society (1966)
- Honorary doctorate, University of Düsseldorf (1985)
- IEEE Heinrich Hertz Medal (1993)
- Gold Medal of the Royal Astronomical Society (1999)

== Bibliography ==
- Radio Waves in the Ionosphere (1961)
- The Wave-guide mode theory of wave propagation (1961)
- Lectures on magnetoionic theory (1964)
- The propagation of radio waves (1985)
