= Mauro Mongiardo =

Italian electrical engineer

Mauro Mongiardo is an electrical engineer at the University of Perugia, Italy. He was named a Fellow of the Institute of Electrical and Electronics Engineers (IEEE) in 2013 for his contributions to the modal analysis of complex electromagnetic structures.
