= Henry L. Bertoni =

American electrical engineer

- Occupations: Electrical engineer, academic, and author

Academic background
- Education: B.S. in Electrical engineering M.S. in Electrical engineering Ph.D. in Electrophysics
- Alma mater: Northwestern University; Polytechnic Institute of Brooklyn

Henry L. Bertoni is an emeritus professor at New York University (NYU) Tandon School of Engineering and a member of NYU Wireless.

Bertoni's research interests have included wave propagation and diffraction, electromagnetics, acoustics, and optics. He is a life fellow of the Institute of Electrical and Electronics Engineers (IEEE). He has received the Jack Neubauer Memorial Award (2000) and the James Evans Avant-Garde Award (2003) from the IEEE Vehicular Technology Society as well as the Wilkes Award (2005) from the British Computer Society.

== Education ==
In 1960, Bertoni completed his B.S. in Electrical Engineering from Northwestern University. Later, from the Polytechnic Institute of Brooklyn, he obtained an M.S. in Electrical Engineering and a Ph.D. in Electrophysics in 1962 and 1967, respectively.

== Career ==
In 1966, Bertoni began his career as an instructor at NYU Tandon School of Engineering. At the same institution, he was appointed as head of the Department of Electrical Engineering for two separate terms, from 1990 to 1995 and again from 2001 to 2004. He was a vice provost for graduate studies from 1995 to 1996 and is a member of NYU Wireless. From 2006 to 2009, he was a director of the Wireless Internet Center for Advanced Technology (WICAT) and from 1998 to 2001, held the role of distinguished lecturer for the IEEE Antennas and Propagation Society from 1998 to 2001. He was an editor for the Journal of Communications and Networks.

== Research ==
While Bertoni's research has addressed electromagnetic, optical, and acoustic wave propagation phenomena, his study on radio propagation for Wireless communications has been a central focus of his work. Together with his students, he co‑developed propagation models that are incorporated into modern radio network planning tools. His studies included propagation models tailored to urban environments, particularly in downtown areas with tall buildings and residential environments. He studied wave propagation in built environments using ray-based propagation models that incorporate specular reflections and edge diffraction in vertical planar building geometries, and introduced the vertical‑plane‑launch (VPL) method to identify propagation paths. His work also explored angular spread generation mechanisms, two-dimensional (2D) ray tracing approach, and scattering effects of resonant periodic wall structures. In an analysis of a wireless communication experiment, he noted that a multi-antenna approach could increase wireless data transmission capacity.

Bertoni's work has extended to optical grating effects of periodic structures and dielectric waveguides, including the theory of periodic dielectric waveguides. In collaborative study, he showed that wave propagation at a fluid solid interface involves lateral shifts and phase reversals and proposed a method for enhancing the Goos-Hänchen shift using structures that support leaky waves and developed an approximate beam reflectivity model that partitions incident wave energy into reflected and leaky Rayleigh waves.

== Awards and honors ==
- 1987 – Life Fellow, IEEE
- 2000 – IEEE Jack Neubauer Memorial Award, IEEE Vehicular Technology Society
- 2003 – IEEE James Evans Avant-Garde Award, IEEE Vehicular Technology Society
- 2005 – Wilkes Award, British Computer Society
- 2022 – Propagation Award, European Association on Antennas and Propagation (EurAAP)

== Selected publications ==
=== Books ===
- Bertoni, Henry L. (2000). Radio Propagation for Modern Wireless Systems. Prentice Hall PTR. ISBN 9780130263735.
- Tamir, Theodor; Griffel, Giora; Bertoni, Henry L. (2013). Guided-Wave Optoelectronics: Device Characterization, Analysis, and Design. Springer. ISBN 9781489910417.

=== Articles ===
- Bertoni, H. L.; Tamir, T. (1973). "Unified Theory of Rayleigh-Angle Phenomena for Acoustic Beams at Liquid-Solid Interfaces". Applied Physics. 2 (4): 157–172. Bibcode:1973ApPhy...2..157B. doi:10.1007/BF00884205.
- Peng, S.T.; Tamir, T.; Bertoni, H.L. (1975). "Theory of Periodic Dielect Waveguides". IEEE Transactions on Microwave Theory and Techniques. 23 (1): 123–133. Bibcode:1975ITMTT..23..123P. doi:10.1109/TMTT.1975.1128513.
- Walfisch, J.; Bertoni, H.L. (1988). "A Theoretical Model of UHF Propagation in Urban Environments". IEEE Transactions on Antennas and Propagation. 36 (12): 1788–1796. Bibcode:1988ITAP...36.1788W. doi:10.1109/8.14401.
- Bertoni, Henry L.; Honcharenko, Walter; Maciel, Leandro Rocha; Xia, Howard H. (1994). "UHF Propagation Prediction for Wireless Personal Communications". Proceedings of the IEEE. 82 (9): 1333–1359. Bibcode:1994IEEEP..82.1333B. doi:10.1109/5.317081.
- Liang, G.; Bertoni, H.L. (1998). "A New Approach to 3-D Ray Tracing for Propagation Prediction in Cities". IEEE Transactions on Antennas and Propagation. 46 (6): 853–863. Bibcode:1998ITAP...46..853L. doi:10.1109/8.686774.
