= TAU (spacecraft) =

Cancelled NASA space probe to travel 1000 AU from the Sun

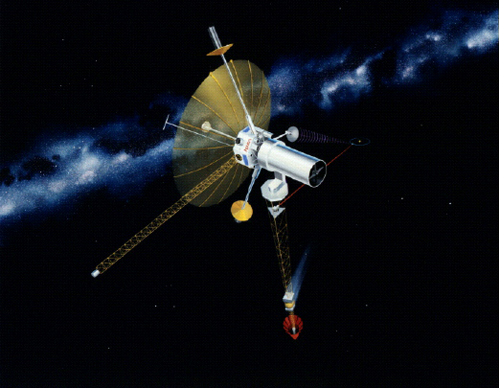
TAU concept art

Stellar parallax is the basis for the parsec, which is the distance from the Sun to an astronomical object that has a parallax angle of one arcsecond. (1 AU and 1 pc are not to scale, 1 pc = ~206265 AU) What TAU would do is use its distance from the Earth to make the parallax measurement, so rather than just 2 AU as with an Earth-based annual parallax it would be hundreds of AU. This would increase the distance measurement horizon from about 500 light years for the Hipparcos satellite to 250 000 light years.

TAU (Thousand Astronomical Units) was a proposed uncrewed interstellar probe that would go to a distance of one thousand astronomical units (1000 AU) from the Earth and Sun by the NASA Jet Propulsion Laboratory in 1987 using tested technology. One scientific purpose would be to measure the distance to other stars via stellar parallax. Studies continued into 1990, working with a launch in the 2005–2010 timeframe.

== Overview ==
TAU was a proposed nuclear electric rocket spacecraft that used a 1 MW fission reactor and an ion drive (with a burn time of about 10 years) to reach a distance of 1000 AU in 50 years. The primary goal of the mission was to improve parallax measurements of the distances to stars inside and outside the Milky Way, with secondary goals being the study of the heliopause, measurements of conditions in the interstellar medium, and (via communications with Earth) tests of general relativity.

One of the tasks envisioned for TAU would be a flyby of Pluto. A Pluto flyby was achieved in 2015 by the New Frontiers program mission New Horizons.

Some of the instruments proposed for the design included a 1.5-meter telescope for observations and a 1-meter telescope for laser communication with Earth.

After launch it would accelerate to about 106 km/s (about 22.4 AU/year, or ~0.04% the speed of light) over 10 years, using xenon as propellant and a nuclear fission reactor for power.

At a distance of 1000 AU parallax measurement will have a baseline 500 times longer than on Earth. With such a long baseline the parallax of the nearest stars will be in the order of arcminutes, making those parallaxes visible even to the naked eye.

== Description and mission profile ==
- Payload module (5,000 kg mass including a 10-watt laser transponder+1-meter-aperture laser communications telescope capable of transmitting data at 20 kilobits/second at 1000 AU, and a 1.5 meter astrometric telescope plus other experiments)
- Propulsion module (4,000 kg dry mass including ten 4.45 newton thrust ion propulsion clustered in groups of five and fired paired for two years each. The total specific mass of ion thrusters, power processor units, etc. would be 4 kg/kWe (kilograms per kilowatt electrical power))
- 1-MWe nuclear reactor+shield+radiator (6,000 kg mass or 12.5 kg/kWe specific mass)

The 25,000 kg (gross launch mass including 10,000 kg of xenon propellant) TAU spacecraft would have been launched into a low Earth orbit by the Space Shuttle in 2005–2010. Once deployed, a central boom would have telescoped the three main units listed above to a total 40 meter length to separate the payload from the nuclear reactor. The ion propulsion/xenon propellant module would have been positioned close to the center of gravity, its 250 km/s exhaust velocity (25,484 seconds Isp) ion engines providing an acceleration of 0.35 mm/s^{2}. TAU would have attained Earth escape velocity in 250 days in a spiraling orbit, followed by Solar System escape speed 700 days later. The projected delta-v would have been 127,706 m/s.

The TAU payload module would have separated from the rest of the spacecraft after ten years of constant thruster firing at a distance of 12 billion km (80 AU) as the xenon propellant tanks would have been depleted. TAU would have reached 200 AU in 15 years after launch, 400 AU in 23 years, 600 AU in 32 years, 800 AU in 41 years and the full 1000 AU in half a century. Even so, it would have traversed less than 0.4% of the 4.3 light years to Alpha Centauri, the nearest star.

== See also ==
- Innovative Interstellar Explorer (NASA 2003)
- Interstellar Probe (NASA 1999)
- Interstellar probe (Generic)
- Cosmic distance ladder
- Related to Solar System departure:
  - Interstellar travel
  - Spacecraft escaping the Solar System (Category)
  - Artificial objects escaping the Solar System
- Nuclear power in space
