= Innovative Interstellar Explorer =

NASA proposed space probe to 1000 AU from the Sun

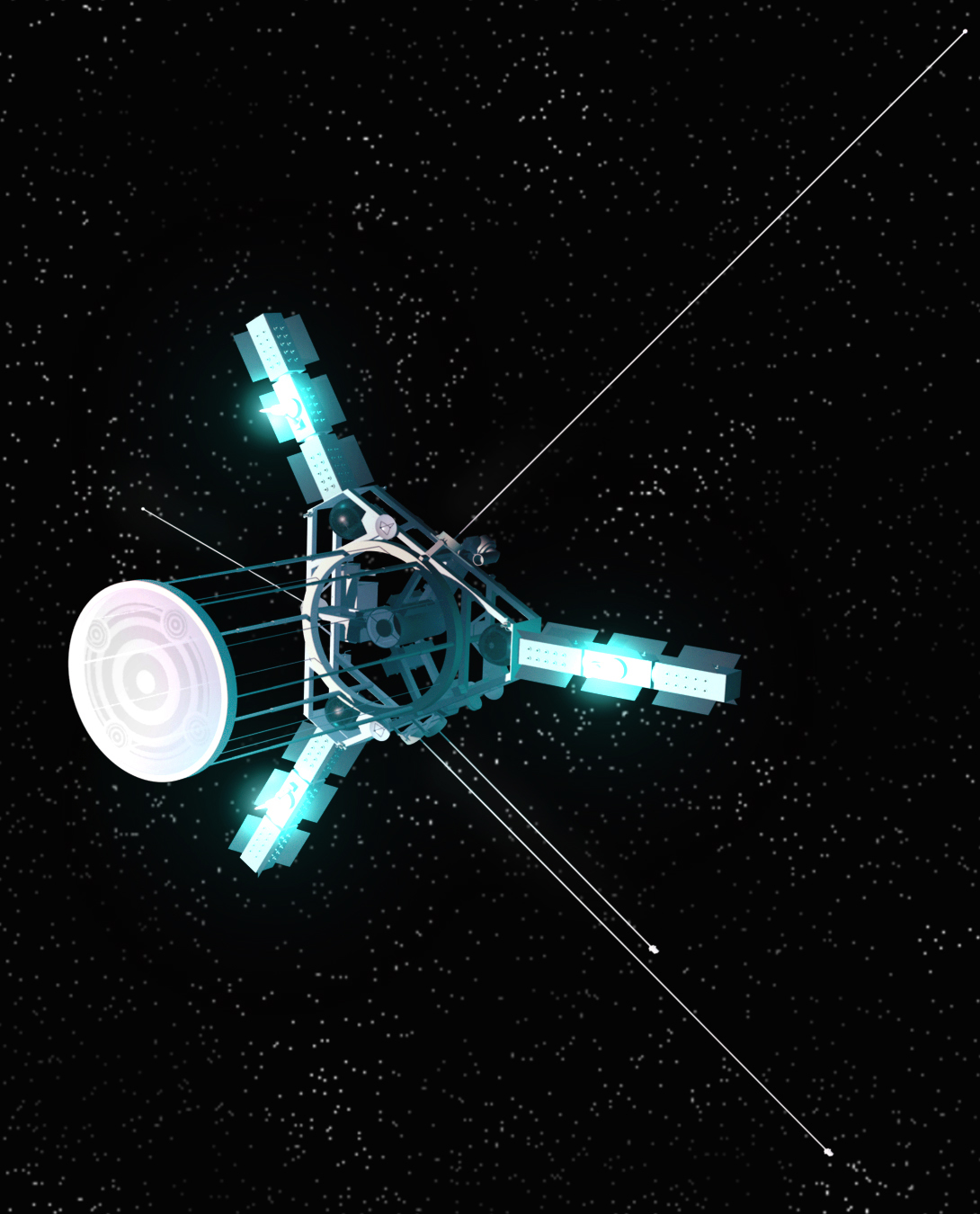
Early concept art for the explorer

Innovative Interstellar Explorer was a NASA "Vision Mission" study funded by NASA following a proposal under NRA-03-OSS-01 on 11 September 2003. This study focused on measuring the interstellar medium, the region outside the influence of the nearest star, the Sun. It proposes to use a radioisotope thermal generator to power ion thrusters.

== History ==
The project is a study of a proposed interstellar precursor mission that would probe the nearby interstellar medium and measure the properties of magnetic fields and cosmic rays and their effects on a spacecraft leaving the Solar System. Mission launch plans analyzed direct, one planet, multi-planet, and upper-stage trades. As a concept study, a number of technologies, configurations, and mission goals were considered, leading to the choice of a spacecraft propelled with ion engines powered by a radioisotope thermoelectric generator (RTG). The focus was getting a spacecraft launched by about 2014, achieving 200 AU by the year 2031.

A variety of strategies were assessed, including using launch windows (not counting backups) for a Jupiter assist in 2014, 2026, 2038, and 2050—about every 12 years. The launch opportunity for the 2014 window passed, but for example it could have resulted in a Jupiter flyby by early 2016 and then go on to reach 200 astronomical units (AU) by 2044. With an ion drive, a speed of about 7.9 AU per year could be attained by the time its xenon propellant was depleted, enabling a travel distance of 200 AU by 2044 and perhaps 1000 AU after one hundred years from launch. Different launch times and configurations have various timelines and options. One configuration for launch saw the use of a Delta IV Heavy and for the upper stages a stack of Star 48 and Star 37 leading to various gravity assist options. Another launch stack that was considered was the Atlas V 551 with a Star 48.

In 2011, the study's primary author gave an update to website Centauri Dreams, giving a retrospective on the mission and its feasibility since its publication in 2003. By that time, some of the earliest launch windows were no longer feasible without a ready spacecraft. Some retrospectives were the advantages and potential of solar sails, but the need for them to be more advanced for a mission, and also the utility of a radioisotope propulsion (REP) for such a mission. REP was the combination of using an RTG to power an ion drive.

== See also ==
- Applied Physics Laboratory
- Interstellar probe
- New Horizons 2
- New Horizons (Pluto flyby 2015, now heading out to KBOs)
- TAU (spacecraft)
