= Ronald N. Bracewell =

Stanford University professor

Ronald N. Bracewell AO
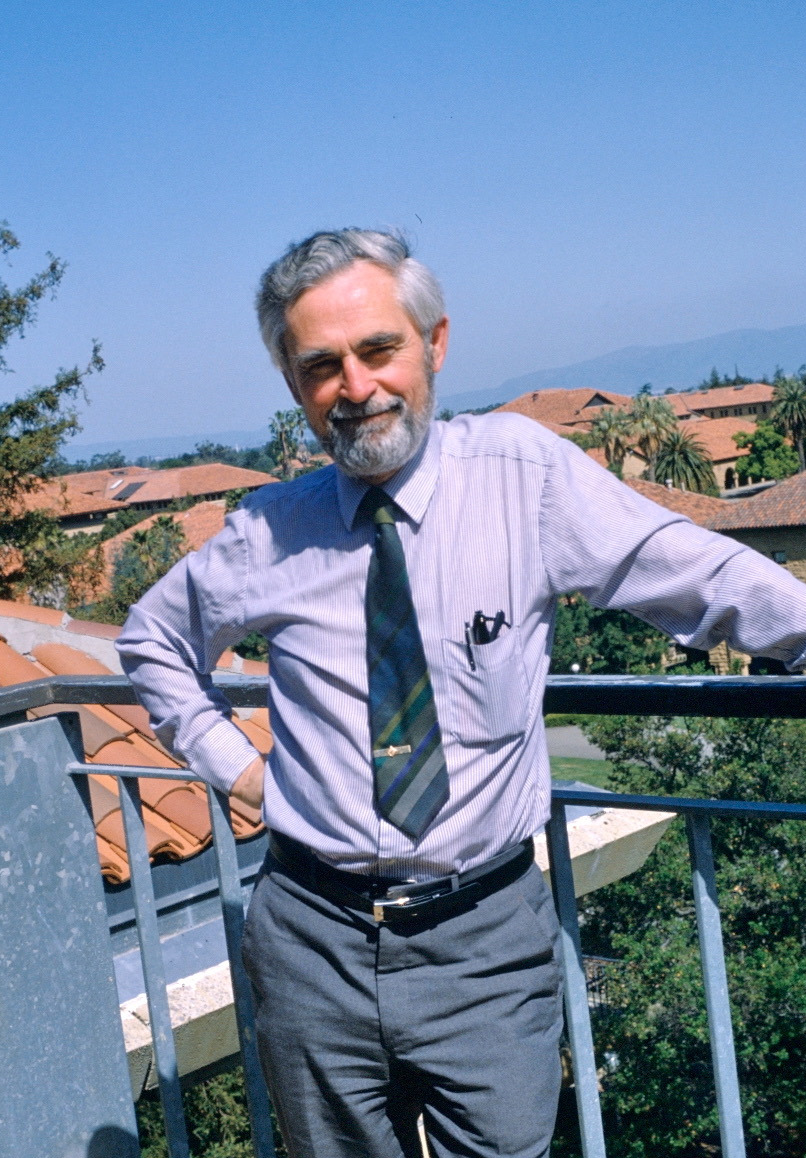
- Bracewell in 1983
- Born: 22 July 1921; Sydney, Australia
- Died: 12 August 2007 (aged 86); Stanford, California, USA
- Education: University of Sydney; University of Cambridge; Sydney Boys High School
- Known for: Bracewell probe Discrete Hartley transform Nulling interferometry Projection-slice theorem
- Awards: IEEE Heinrich Hertz Medal (1994); Officer of the Order of Australia (1998)
- Scientific career
- Fields: Physics; Mathematics; Radio astronomy
- Workplaces: CSIRO; University of California, Berkeley; Stanford University
- Doctoral advisor: J. A. Ratcliffe

Ronald Newbold Bracewell AO (22 July 1921 – 12 August 2007) was the Lewis M. Terman Professor of Electrical Engineering of the Space, Telecommunications, and Radioscience Laboratory at Stanford University.

== Education ==
Bracewell was born in Sydney, in 1921, and educated at Sydney Boys High School. He graduated from the University of Sydney in 1941 with the BSc degree in mathematics and physics, later receiving the degrees of B.E. (1943), and M.E. (1948) with first class honours, and while working in the Engineering Department became the President of the Oxometrical society. During World War II he designed and developed microwave radar equipment in the Radiophysics Laboratory of the Commonwealth Scientific and Industrial Research Organisation, Sydney under the direction of Joseph L. Pawsey and Edward G. Bowen and from 1946 to 1949 was a research student at Sidney Sussex College, Cambridge, engaged in ionospheric research in the Cavendish Laboratory, where in 1949 he received his PhD degree in physics under J. A. Ratcliffe.

== Career ==
From October 1949 to September 1954, Dr. Bracewell was a senior research officer at the Radiophysics Laboratory of the CSIRO, Sydney, concerned with very-long-wave propagation and radio astronomy. He then lectured in radio astronomy at the Astronomy Department of the University of California, Berkeley, from September 1954 to June 1955 at the invitation of Otto Struve, and at Stanford University during the summer of 1955, and joined the Electrical Engineering faculty at Stanford in December 1955.

In 1974 he was appointed the first Lewis M. Terman Professor and Fellow in Electrical Engineering (1974–1979). Though he retired in 1979, he continued to be active until his death.

== Contributions and honours ==
Professor Bracewell was a Fellow of the Royal Astronomical Society (1950), Fellow and life member of the Institute of Electrical and Electronics Engineers (1961), Fellow of the American Association for the Advancement of Science (1989), and was a Fellow with other significant societies and organisations.

For experimental contributions to the study of the ionosphere by means of very low frequency waves, Dr. Bracewell received the Duddell Premium of the Institution of Electrical Engineers, London in 1952. In 1992 he was elected to foreign associate membership of the Institute of Medicine of the U.S. National Academy of Sciences (1992), the first Australian to achieve that distinction, for fundamental contributions to medical imaging. He was one of Sydney University's three honourees when alumni awards were instituted in 1992, with a citation for brain scanning, and was the 1994 recipient of the Institute of Electrical and Electronics Engineers' Heinrich Hertz medal for pioneering work in antenna aperture synthesis and image reconstruction as applied to radio astronomy and to computer-assisted tomography. In 1998 Dr. Bracewell was named Officer of the Order of Australia (AO) for service to science in the fields of radio astronomy and image reconstruction.

At CSIRO Radiophysics Laboratory, work that in 1942–1945 was classified appeared in a dozen reports. Activities included design, construction, and demonstration of voice-modulation equipment for a 10 cm magnetron (July 1943), a microwave triode oscillator at 25 cm using cylindrical cavity resonators, equipment designed for microwave radar in field use (wavemeter, echo box, thermistor power meter, etc.) and microwave measurement technique. Experience with numerical computation of fields in cavities led, after the war, to a Master of Engineering degree (1948) and the definitive publication on step discontinuities in radial transmission lines (1954).

While at the Cavendish Laboratory, Cambridge (1946–1950) Bracewell worked on observation and theory of upper atmospheric ionisation, contributing to experimental technique (1948), explaining solar effects (1949), and distinguishing two layers below the E-layer (1952), work recognised by the Duddell Premium.

While at Stanford, Professor Bracewell constructed a microwave spectroheliograph (1961), a radio telescope comprising 32 10 ft dishes arranged in a cross, which produced daily temperature maps of the Sun reliably for eleven years, the duration of a solar cycle. The first radio telescope to give output automatically in printed form, and therefore capable of worldwide dissemination by teleprinter, its daily solar weather maps received acknowledgement from NASA for support of the first crewed landing on the Moon. Subsequently, five larger 60 ft dishes were built at the same site, and were eventually removed in 2006 after efforts to preserve the site. Bracewell was interviewed during the destruction of the dishes.

Many fundamental papers on restoration (1954–1962), interferometry (1958–1974) and reconstruction (1956–1961) appeared along with instrumental and observational papers. By 1961 the radio-interferometer calibration techniques developed for the spectroheliograph first allowed an antenna system, with 52-inch fan beam, to equal the angular resolution of the human eye in one observation. With this beam the components of Cygnus A, spaced 100-inch, were put directly in evidence without the need for repeated observations with variable spacing aperture synthesis interferometry.

The nucleus of the extragalactic source Centaurus A was resolved into two separate components whose right ascensions were accurately determined with a 2.3-minute fan beam at 9.1 cm. Knowing that Centaurus A was composite, Bracewell used the 6.7-minute beam of the Parkes Observatory 64 m radio telescope at 10 cm to determine the separate declinations of the components and in so doing was the first to observe strong polarisation in an extragalactic source (1962), a discovery of fundamental significance for the structure and role of astrophysical magnetic fields. Subsequent observations made at Parkes by other observers with a 14-minute and wider beams at 21 cm and longer wavelengths, though not resolving the components, were compatible with the $\lambda^2$ dependence expected from Faraday rotation if magnetic fields were the polarising agent.

A second major radiotelescope (1971) employing advanced concepts to achieve an angular resolution of 18 seconds of arc was designed and built at Stanford and applied to both solar and galactic studies. The calibration techniques for this leading-edge resolution passed into general use in radio interferometry via the medium of alumni.

Upon the discovery of the cosmic background radiation:

- a remarkable observational limit of 1.7 millikelvins, with considerable theoretical significance for cosmology, was set on the anisotropy in collaboration with PhD student E. K. Conklin (1967), and was not improved on for many years
- the correct theory of a relativistic observer in a blackbody enclosure (1968) was given in the first of several papers by various authors obtaining the same result
- the absolute motion of the Sun at 308 km/s through the cosmic background radiation was measured by Conklin in 1969, some years before independent confirmation.

With the advent of the space age, Bracewell became interested in celestial mechanics, made observations of the radio emission from Sputnik 1, and supplied the press with accurate charts predicting the path of Soviet satellites, which were perfectly visible, if you knew when and where to look. Following the puzzling performance of Explorer I in orbit, he published the first explanation (1958–59) of the observed spin instability of satellites, in terms of the Poinsot motion of a non-rigid body with internal friction. He recorded the signals from Sputniks I, II and III and discussed them in terms of the satellite spin, antenna polarisation, and propagation effects of the ionised medium, especially Faraday effect.

Later (1978, 1979) he invented a spinning, nulling, two-element infrared interferometer suitable for space-shuttle launching into an orbit near Jupiter, with milliarcsecond resolution, that could lead to the discovery of planets around stars other than the Sun. This concept was elaborated in 1995 by Angel and Woolf, whose space-station version with four-element double nulling became the Terrestrial Planet Finder (TPF), NASA's candidate for imaging planetary configurations of other stars.

Imaging in astronomy led to participation in development of computer assisted x-ray tomography, where commercial scanners reconstruct tomographic images using the algorithm developed by Bracewell for radioastronomical reconstruction from fan-beam scans. This corpus of work has been recognized by the Institute of Medicine, an award by the University of Sydney, and the Heinrich Hertz medal. Service on the founding editorial board of the Journal for Computer-Assisted Tomography, to which he also contributed publications, and on the scientific advisory boards of medical instrumentation companies maintained Bracewell's interest in medical imaging, which became an important part of his regular graduate lectures on imaging, and forms an important part of his 1995 text on imaging.

Experience with the optics, mechanics and control of radiotelescopes led to involvement with solar thermophotovoltaic energy at the time of the energy crisis, including the fabrication of low-cost solid and perforated paraboloidal reflectors by hydraulic inflation.

Bracewell is also known for being the first to propose the use of autonomous artificial intelligence powered interstellar space probes for communication between alien civilisations as an alternative to radio transmission dialogs. This hypothetical concept has been dubbed the Bracewell probe after its inventor.

=== Fourier analysis ===
As a consequence of relating images to Fourier analysis, in 1983 he discovered a new factorisation of the discrete Fourier transform matrix leading to a fast algorithm for spectral analysis. This method, which has advantages over the fast Fourier algorithm, especially for images, is treated in The Hartley Transform (1986), in U.S. Patent 4,646,256 (1987, now in the public domain), and in over 200 technical papers by various authors that were stimulated by the discovery. Analogue methods of creating a Hartley transform plane first with light and later with microwaves were demonstrated in the laboratory and permitted the determination of electromagnetic phase by the use of square-law detectors. A new elementary signal representation, the Chirplet transform, was discovered (1991) that complements the Gabor elementary signal representations used in dynamic spectral analysis (with the property of meeting the bandwidth-duration minimum associated with the uncertainty principle). This advance opened a new field of adaptive dynamic spectra with wide application in information analysis.

=== Other interests ===
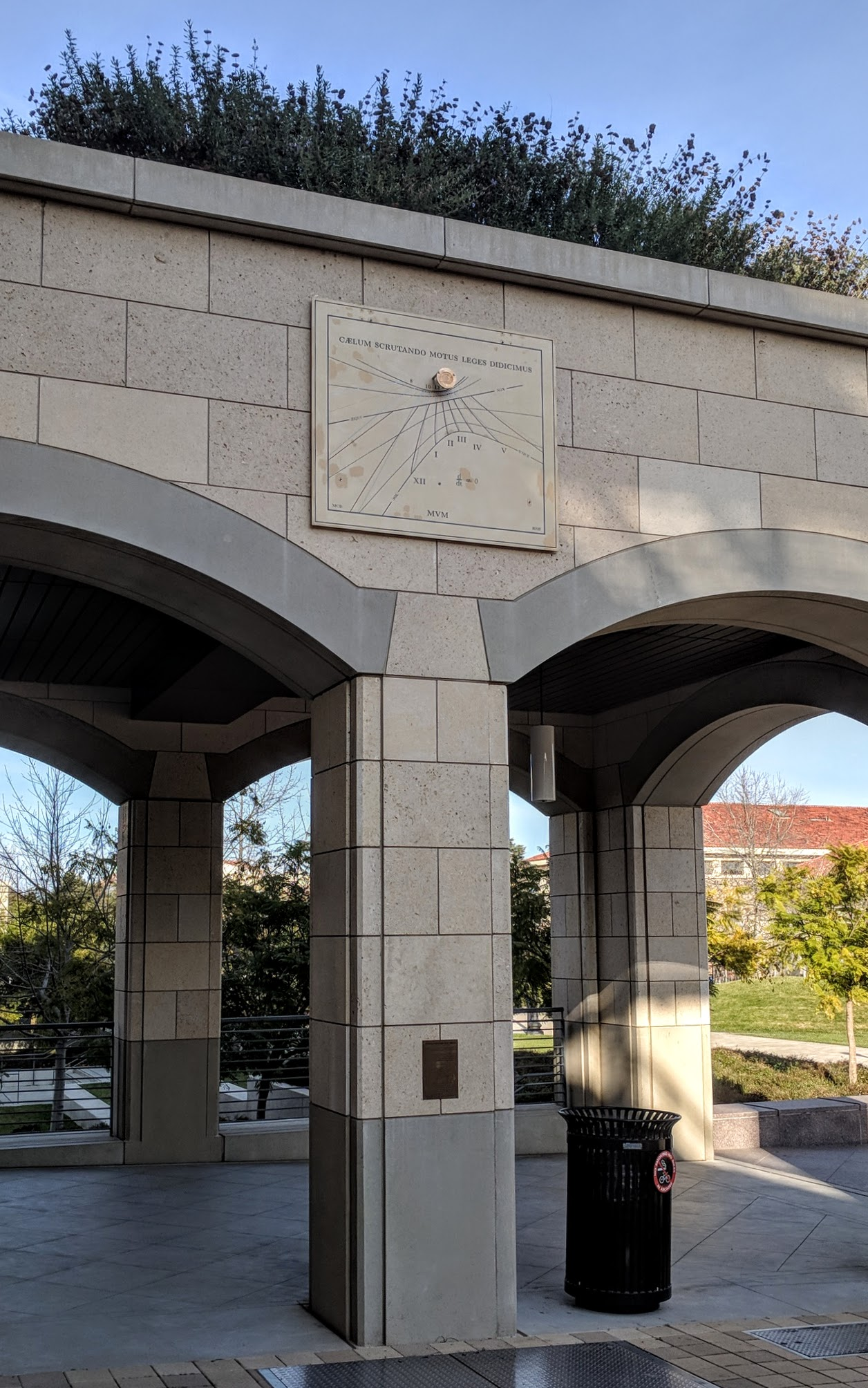
The sundial made by Bracewell and son, now on the Huang building

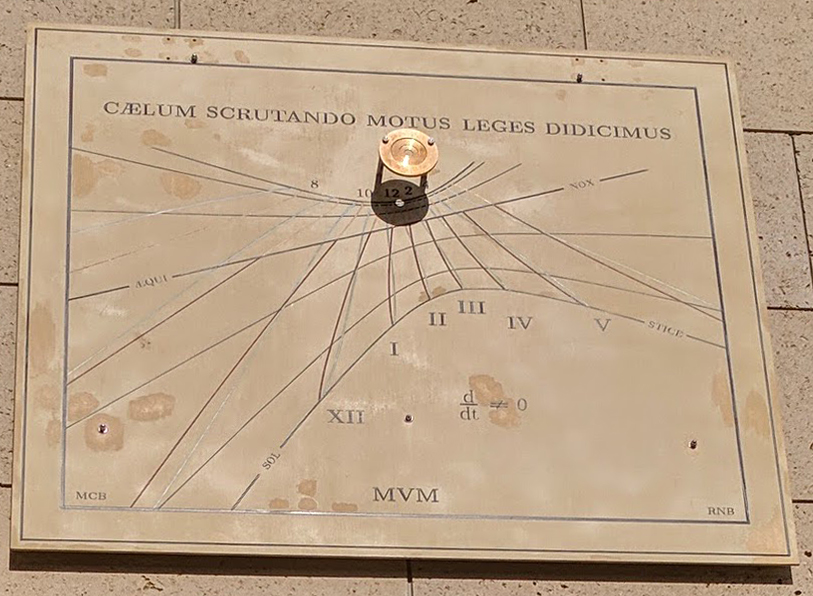
Closer view of the Bracewells' sundial, in the sun, about 1 pm, a few weeks after the winter solstice

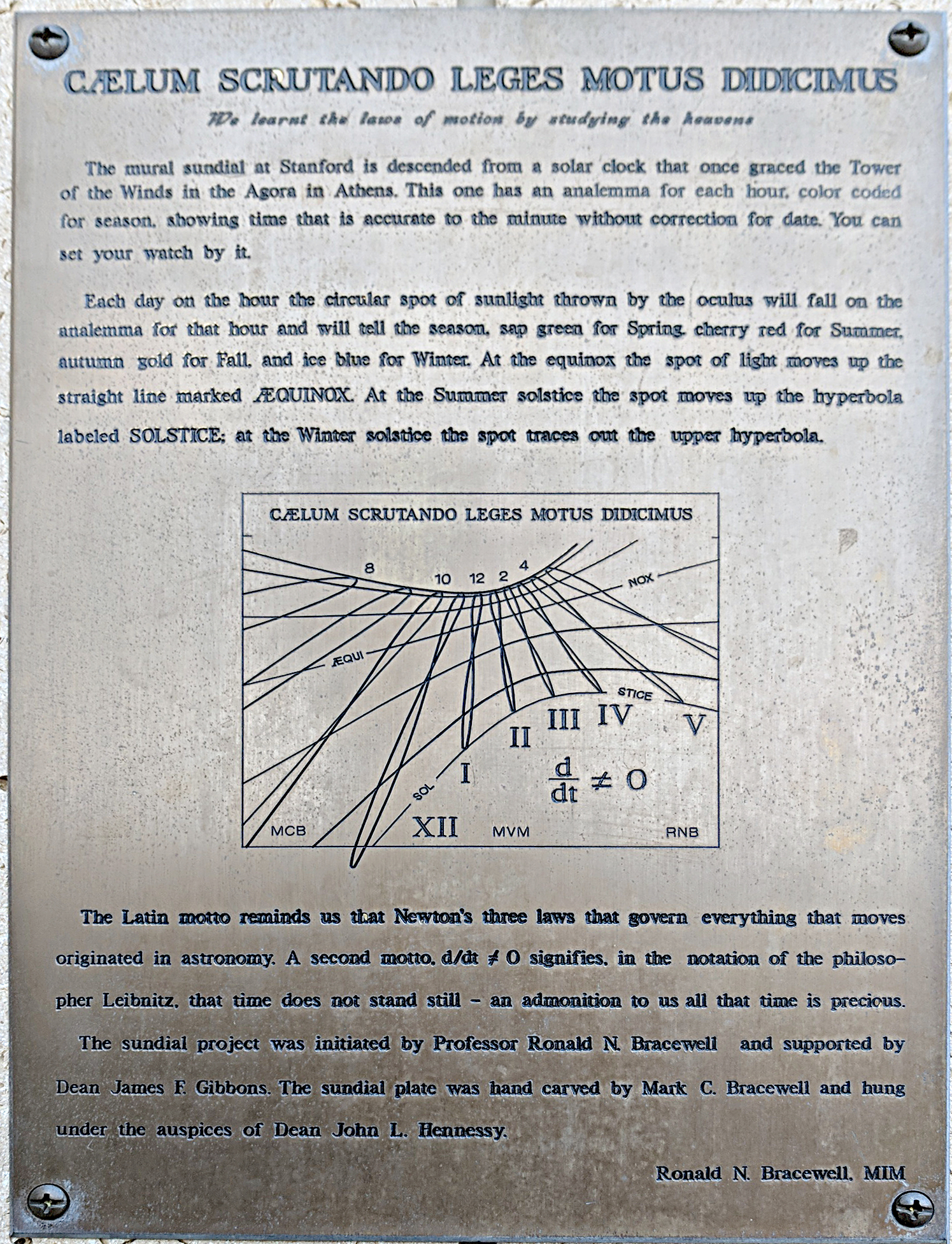
The original plaque for the sundial, now below on the sundial on the Huang building

Professor Bracewell was interested in conveying an appreciation of the role of science in society to the public, in mitigating the effects of scientific illiteracy on public decision making through contact with alumni groups, and in liberal undergraduate education within the framework of the Astronomy Course Program and the Western Culture program in Values, Technology, Science and Society, in both of which he taught for some years. He gave the 1996 Bunyan Lecture on The Destiny of Man.

He was also interested in the trees of Stanford's campus and published a book about them. He also taught an undergraduate seminar titled I Dig Trees.

Bracewell was also a designer and builder of sundials. He and his son Mark Bracewell built one on the South side of the Terman Engineering Building; after that building was demolished, a new home for the sundial, at the same orientation, was found on the Jen-Hsun Huang Engineering Center. He built another sundial at the home of his son, and another on the deck of professor John G. Linvill's house. The Bracewell Radio Sundial at the Very Large Array was built in his honor.

== Selected publications ==
- Bracewell, Ronald N. and Pawsey, J. L., Radio Astronomy (Oxford, 1955) (also translated into Russian and reprinted in China)
- Bracewell, Ronald N., Radio Interferometry of Discrete Sources (Proceedings of the IRE, January 1958)
- Bracewell, Ronald N., ed., Paris Symposium on Radio Astronomy, IAU Symposium no. 9 and URSI Symposium no. 1, held July 30, 1958 – August 6, 1958 (Stanford Univ. Press, Stanford, CA, 1959) (also translated into Russian)
- Professor Bracewell translated Radio Astronomy, by J. L. Steinberg and J. Lequeux, (McGraw-Hill, 1963) from French
- Bracewell, Ronald N. (June 1999) [1985, 1978, 1965]. The Fourier Transform and Its Applications (3 ed.). McGraw-Hill. ISBN 978-0-07303938-1. (NB. Second edition also translated into Japanese and Polish.)
- Bracewell, Ronald N., Trees on the Stanford Campus (Stanford: Samizdat, 1973)
- Bracewell, Ronald N., The Galactic Club: Intelligent Life in Outer Space (Portable Stanford: Alumni Association, 1974) (also translated into Dutch, Japanese, and Italian)
- Bracewell, Ronald N. (1986). The Hartley Transform. Oxford Engineering Science Series. Vol. 19 (1 ed.). New York: Oxford University Press, Inc. ISBN 0-19-503969-6. (NB. Also translated into German and Russian.)
- Bracewell, Ronald N., Two-Dimensional Imaging (Prentice-Hall, 1995)
- Bracewell, Ronald N., Fourier Analysis and Imaging (Plenum, 2004)
- Bracewell, Ronald N., Trees of Stanford and Environs (Stanford Historical Society, 2005)

== Chapter contributions ==
Bracewell has contributed chapters to:

- Textbook of Radar Microwave Transmission and Cavity Resonator Theory, ed. E. G. Bowen, 1946
- Advances in Astronautical Sciences Satellite Rotation, ed. H. Jacobs, 1959
- The Radio Noise Spectrum Correcting Noise Maps for Beamwidth, ed. D. H. Menzel, 1960
- Modern Physics for the Engineer Radio Astronomy, ed. L. Ridenour and W. Nierenberg, 1960
- Statistical methods in Radio Wave Propagation Antenna Tolerance Theory, ed. W. C. Hoffman, 1960
- Advances in Geophysics Satellite Studies of the Ionization in Space by Radio, ed. H. E. Landsberg, 1961 (O. K. Garriott and Ronald N. Bracewell)
- Handbuch der Physik Radio Astronomy Techniques, ed. S. Flugge, 1962
- Encyclopedia of Electronics Extraterrestrial Radio Noise, ed. C. Susskind, 1962
- Stars and Galaxies Radio Broadcasts from the Depths of Space, ed. T. L. Page, 1962
- Radio Waves and Circuits Aerials and Data Processing, ed. S. Silver, 1963
- Light and Life in the Universe Life in the Galaxy, ed. S. T. Butler and H. Messel, 1964
- Encyclopædia Britannica Telescope, Radio, 1967
- Vistas in Science The Microwave Sky, ed. David L. Arm, 1968
- Man in Inner and Outer Space The Sun (Five Chapters), ed. H. Messel and S. T. Butler, 1968
- Image Reconstruction from Projections: Implementation and Applications Image Reconstruction in Radio Astronomy, ed. G. Hermann, 1979
- Annual Review of Astronomy and Astrophysics Computer Image Processing, ed. G. Burbidge et al., 1979
- Energy for Survival How It All Began, Man the Lazy Animal, and Energy from Sunlight, ed. H. Messel, 1979
- Life in the Universe Manifestations of Advanced Civilizations, ed. J. Billingham, 1981
- Extraterrestrials: Where Are They? Preemption of the Galaxy by the First Advanced Civilization, ed. M. H. Hart and B. Zuckerman, 1982, 1995
- Transformations in Optical Signal Processing Fourier Inversion of Deficient Data, ed. W. T. Rhodes, J. R. Fienup and B. E. A. Saleh, 1984
- The Early Years of Radio Astronomy Early Work on Imaging Theory in Radio Astronomy, ed. W. T. Sullivan, III, 1984
- Indirect Imaging Inversion of Nonplanar Visibilities, ed. J. A. Roberts, 1984
- Fourier Techniques and Applications The Life of Joseph Fourier and Fourier Techniques and Applications, ed. J. F. Price, 1985
- Yearbook of Science and Technology Wavelets, 1996
- Encyclopedia of Applied Physics Fourier and Other Mathematical Transforms 1997
- Cornelius Lanczos—Collected Published Papers with Commentaries The Fast Fourier Transform andSmoothing Data by Analysis and by Eye ed. W. R. Davis et al., 1999

== See also ==
- cas (mathematics)
