= ICAN =

ICAN may refer to:

== Organizations ==
- Informed Consent Action Network, a US antivaccine group
- International Campaign to Abolish Nuclear Weapons, headquartered in Switzerland
- International Children Assistance Network, mainly for Vietnamese-Anericans
- International Christian Academy of Nagoya, a defunct school in Japan
- International Commission for Air Navigation, the predecessor of the International Civil Aviation Organization
- Nationalist Canarian Initiative, a former political party in the Canary Islands

=== Accountancy ===
- Institute of Chartered Accountants of Namibia
- Institute of Chartered Accountants of Nepal
- Institute of Chartered Accountants of Nigeria

== Other uses ==
- Battle of Ican (1864), of the Russian conquest of Central Asia
- Icán River, a river in Guatemala
- ICAN: Infant, Child, & Adolescent Nutrition, a medical journal
- Interim Capability for Airborne Networking, a system operated by the US Air Force
- International Code of Area Nomenclature, a universal naming system for areas of endemism used in biogeography
- 1-Isocyano-5-aminonaphthalene, a chemical compound

== See also ==
- I Can (disambiguation)
- Icahn (disambiguation)
- ICANN, involved in the governance of the Internet
- ICAN-II (spacecraft), for a proposed mission to Mars
