= Nuclear propulsion =

Nuclear power to propel a vehicle

Pressurised water reactors are the most common reactors used in ships and submarines. The pictorial diagram shows the operating principles. Primary coolant is in orange and the secondary coolant (steam and later feedwater) is in blue.

Nuclear propulsion includes a wide variety of propulsion methods that use some form of nuclear reaction as their primary power source. Many aircraft carriers and submarines currently use uranium fueled nuclear reactors that can provide propulsion for long periods without refueling. There are also applications in the space sector with nuclear thermal and nuclear electric engines which could be more efficient than conventional rocket engines.

The idea of using nuclear material for propulsion dates back to the beginning of the 20th century. In 1903 it was hypothesized that radioactive material, radium, might be a suitable fuel for engines to propel cars, planes, and boats. H. G. Wells picked up this idea in his 1914 fiction work The World Set Free.

== Surface ships, submarines, and torpedoes ==
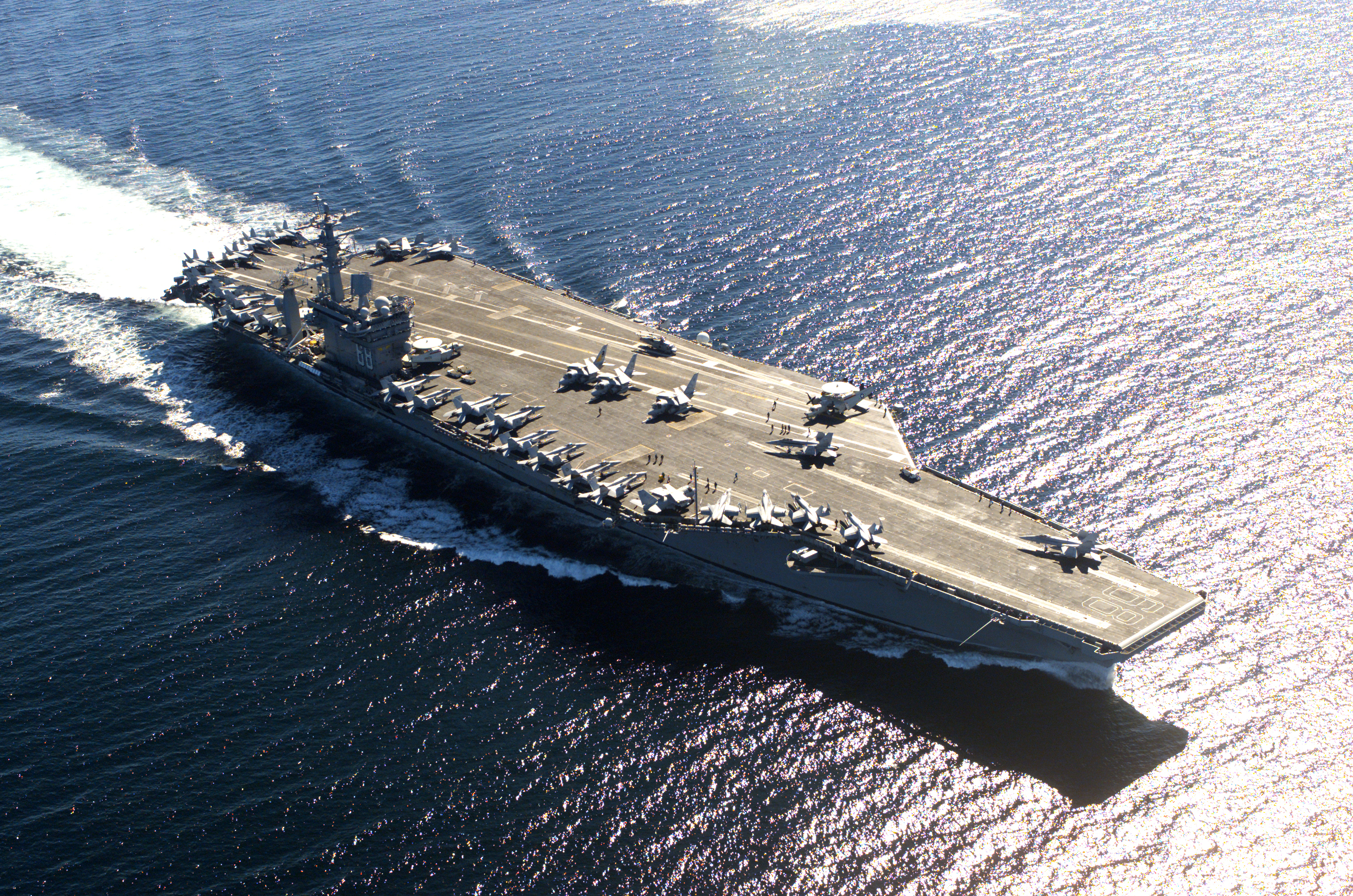
USS Nimitz (CVN-68), lead ship of the Nimitz-class of nuclear-powered aircraft carriers

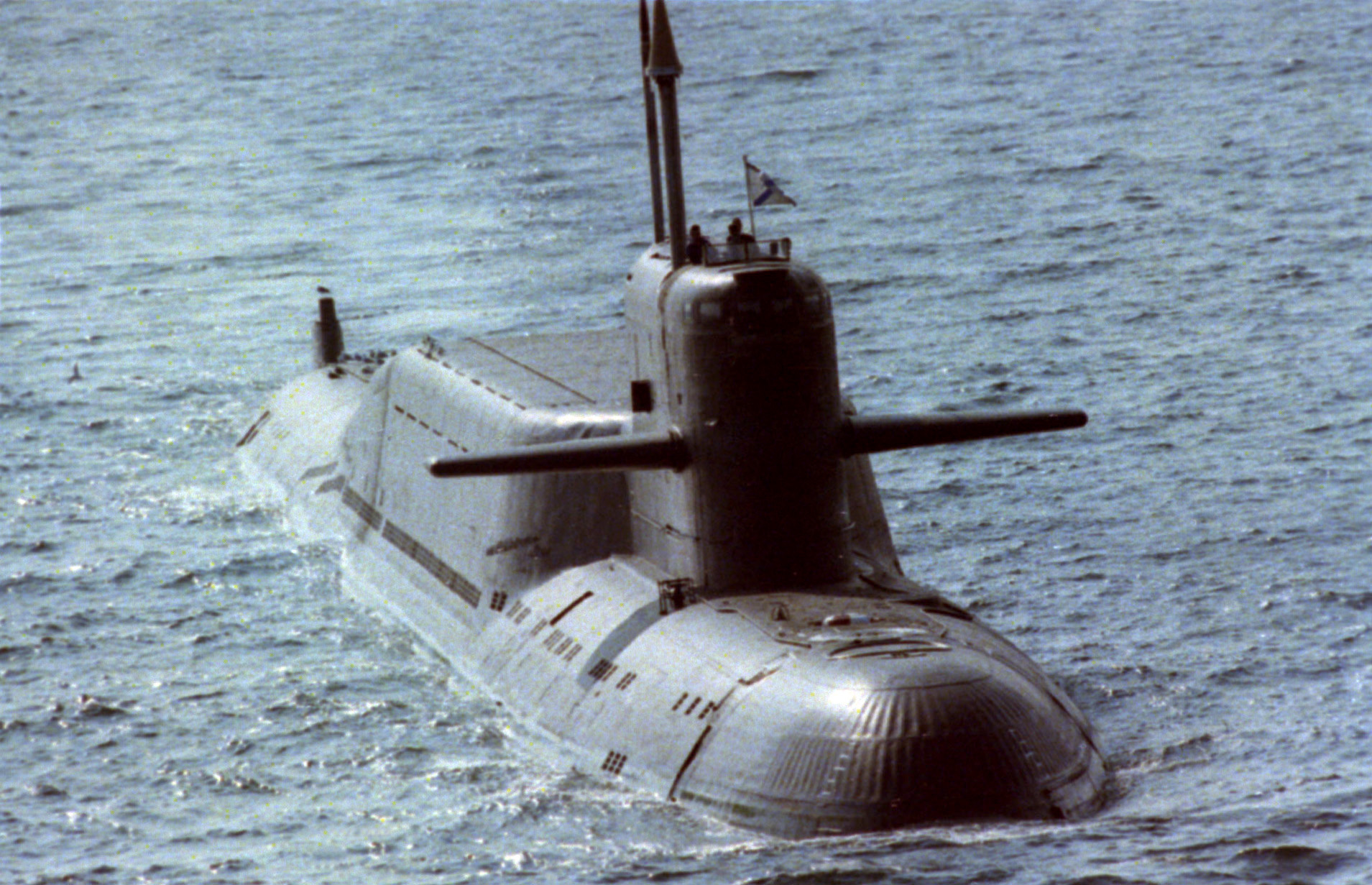
A Delta-class nuclear-powered submarine

Nuclear-powered vessels are mainly military submarines, and aircraft carriers. Russia is the only country that currently has nuclear-powered civilian surface ships, mainly icebreakers. The US Navy currently (as of 2022) has 11 aircraft carriers and 70 submarines in service, that are all powered by nuclear reactors. For more detailed articles see:

=== Civilian maritime use ===
- Civilian nuclear ships
- List of civilian nuclear ships

=== Military maritime use ===
- Nuclear navy
- List of United States Naval reactors
- Soviet naval reactors
- Nuclear submarine

=== Torpedo ===
Russia's Channel One Television news broadcast a picture and details of a nuclear-powered torpedo called Status-6 on about 12 November 2015. The torpedo was stated as having a range of up to 10,000 km, a cruising speed of 100 knots, and an operational depth of up to 1000 metres below the surface. The torpedo carried a 100-megaton nuclear warhead.

One of the suggestions emerging in the summer of 1958 from the first meeting of the scientific advisory group that became JASON was for "a nuclear-powered torpedo that could roam the seas almost indefinitely".

== Aircraft and missiles ==
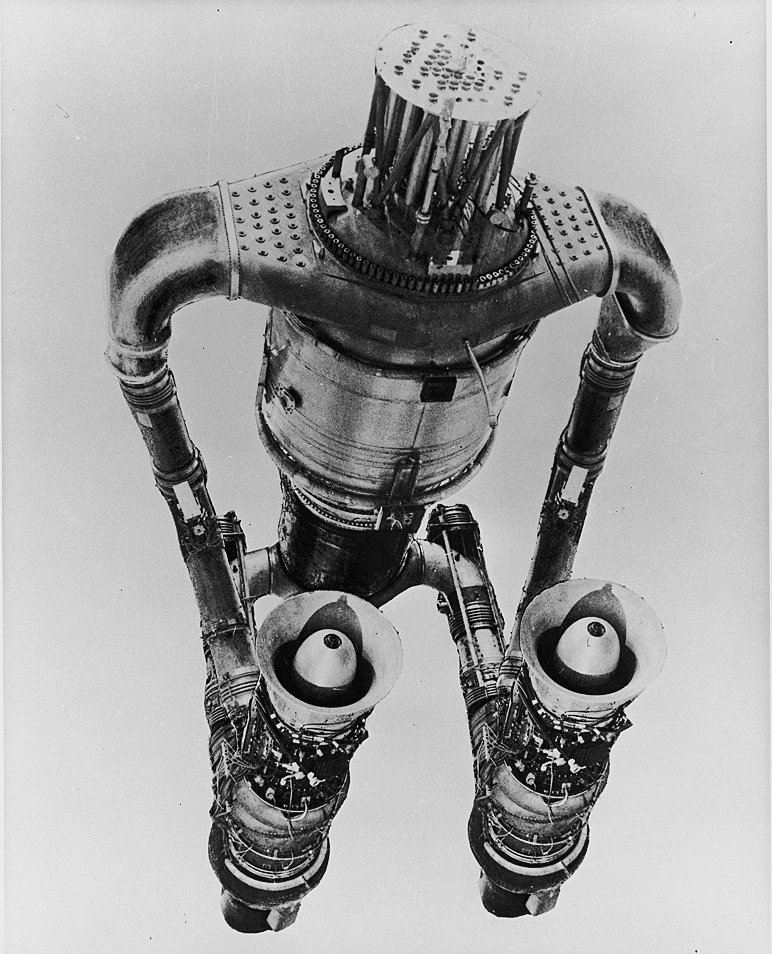
A picture of an Aircraft Nuclear Propulsion system, known as HTRE-3 (Heat Transfer Reactor Experiment no. 3). The central EBR-1 based reactor took the place of chemical fuel combustion to heat the air. The reactor rapidly raised the temperature via an air heat exchanger and powered the dual J47 engines in a number of ground tests.

Research into nuclear-powered aircraft was pursued during the Cold War by the United States and the Soviet Union as they would presumably allow a country to keep nuclear bombers in the air for extremely long periods of time, a useful tactic for nuclear deterrence. Neither country created any operational nuclear aircraft. One design problem, never adequately solved, was the need for heavy shielding to protect the crew from radiation sickness. Since the advent of ICBMs in the 1960s the tactical advantage of such aircraft was greatly diminished and respective projects were cancelled. Because the technology was inherently dangerous it was not considered in non-military contexts. Nuclear-powered missiles were also researched and discounted during the same period.

=== Aircraft ===
- Convair X-6
- Aircraft Nuclear Propulsion – General Electric's project to build a nuclear-powered bomber
- Tupolev Tu-95LAL

=== Missiles ===
- Project Pluto – which developed the SLAM missile, that used a nuclear-powered air ramjet for propulsion
- Burevestnik nuclear-powered cruise missile announced by Vladimir Putin in 2018.

== Spacecraft ==
The attraction of nuclear propulsion and power in space is built on the theoretical energy efficiency and endurance that can be delivered with a nuclear system, enabling it to function over long distances. However, the systems needed to protect humans in both the space-lift and operations phases are significant detriments. Many types of nuclear propulsion have been proposed as follows.

=== Nuclear pulse propulsion ===
- Project Orion, first engineering design study of nuclear pulse (i.e., atomic explosion) propulsion
- Project Daedalus, 1970s British Interplanetary Society study of a fusion rocket
- Project Longshot, US Naval Academy-NASA nuclear pulse propulsion design
- AIMStar, a proposed Antimatter-catalyzed nuclear pulse propulsion craft that uses clouds of antiprotons to initiate fission and fusion within fuel pellets
- ICAN-II, a proposed crewed interplanetary spacecraft that used the antimatter-catalyzed nuclear pulse propulsion engine as its main form of propulsion
- External Pulsed Plasma Propulsion (EPPP), a propulsion concept by NASA that derives its thrust from plasma waves generated from a series of small, supercritical fission/fusion pulses behind an object in space.

=== Nuclear thermal rocket ===
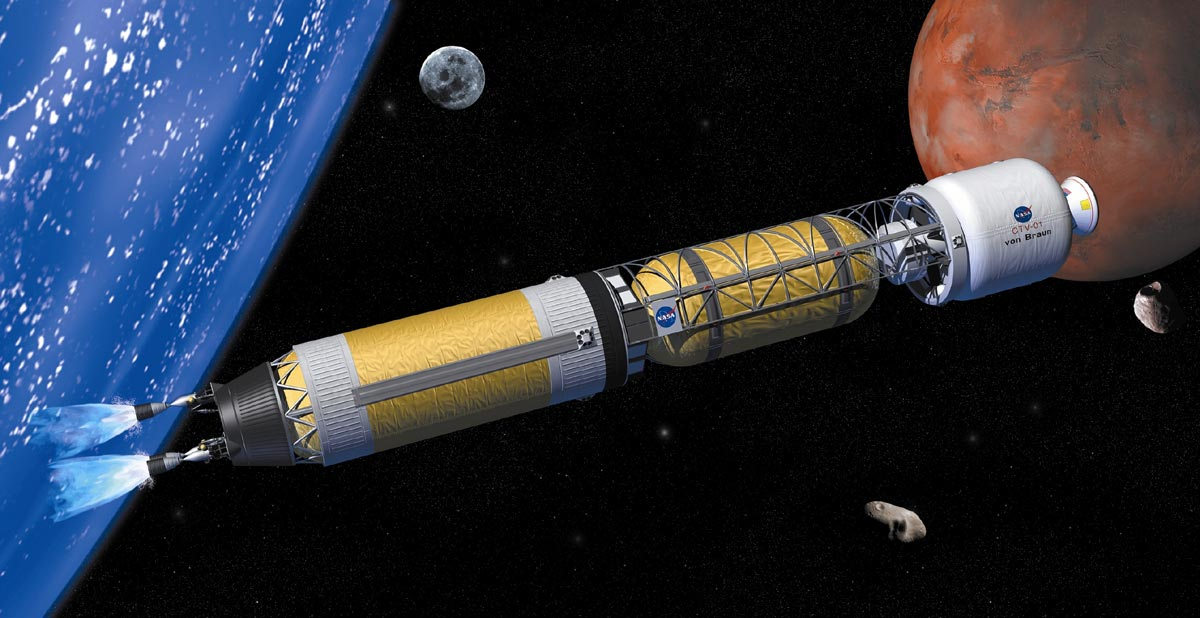
Bimodal nuclear thermal rockets conduct nuclear fission reactions similar to those employed at nuclear power plants including submarines. The energy is used to heat the liquid hydrogen propellant. The vehicle depicted is the "Copernicus" an upper stage assembly being designed for the Space Launch System (2010).

Bimodal nuclear thermal rockets conduct nuclear fission reactions similar to those employed at nuclear power plants including submarines. The energy is used to heat the liquid hydrogen propellant. Advocates of nuclear-powered spacecraft point out that at the time of launch, there is almost no radiation released from the nuclear reactors. Nuclear-powered rockets are not used to lift off the Earth. Nuclear thermal rockets can provide great performance advantages compared to chemical propulsion systems. Nuclear power sources could also be used to provide the spacecraft with electrical power for operations and scientific instrumentation. Examples:

- NERVA (Nuclear Energy for Rocket Vehicle Applications), a US nuclear thermal rocket program.
- Project Rover, an American project to develop a nuclear thermal rocket. The program ran at the Los Alamos Scientific Laboratory from 1955 through 1972.
- Project Timberwind (1987–1991), part of the Strategic Defense Initiative
- RD-0410, a Soviet nuclear thermal rocket engine developed from 1965 through the 1980s
- Demonstration Rocket for Agile Cislunar Operations (DRACO), under development in the 2020s

=== Ramjet ===
- Bussard ramjet, a conceptual interstellar fusion ramjet named after Robert W. Bussard.

=== Direct nuclear ===
- Fission fragment rocket
- Fission sail
- Fusion rocket
- Gas core reactor rocket
- Nuclear salt-water rocket
- Radioisotope rocket
- Nuclear photonic rocket

=== Nuclear electric ===
Nuclear electric propulsion is a type of spacecraft propulsion system where a nuclear reactor generates thermal energy which is converted to electrical energy, that drives an ion thruster or other electrical spacecraft propulsion technology. Examples of nuclear electric systems:

- SNAP-10A, launched into orbit by USAF in 1965, was the first use of a nuclear reactor in space and of an ion thruster in orbit.
- US-A satellite series, launched by into orbit by the USSR, included Kosmos 1818 and Kosmos 1867 in 1987, using the TOPAZ nuclear reactor and a "Plazma-2 SPT" Hall-effect thruster.
- Project Prometheus, NASA development of nuclear propulsion for long-duration spaceflight, begun in 2003.
- Transport and Energy Module (TEM). In April 2011, Anatoly Perminov, head of the Russian Federal Space Agency, announced that it is going to develop a nuclear-powered spacecraft for deep space travel. Preliminary design was done by 2013, and 9 more years are planned for development (in space assembly). The price is set at 17 billion rubles (600 million dollars). The nuclear propulsion would offer mega-watt class power and would consist of a space nuclear power and a matrix of ion engines According to Perminov, the propulsion will be able to support human mission to Mars, with cosmonauts staying on the Red planet for 30 days. This journey to Mars with nuclear propulsion and a steady acceleration would take six weeks, instead of eight months by using chemical propulsion – assuming thrust of 300 times higher than that of chemical propulsion.

== Ground vehicles ==
=== Automobiles ===
The idea of making cars that used radioactive material, radium, for fuel dates back to at least 1903. Analysis of the concept in 1937 indicated that the driver of such a vehicle might need a 50-ton lead barrier to shield them from radiation.

In 1941, a Caltech physicist named R. M. Langer espoused the idea of a car powered by uranium-235 in the January edition of Popular Mechanics. He was followed by William Bushnell Stout, designer of the Stout Scarab and former Society of Engineers president, on 7 August 1945 in The New York Times. The problem of shielding the reactor continued to render the idea impractical. In December 1945, a John Wilson of London, announced he had created an atomic car. This created considerable interest. The Minister of Fuel and Power along with a large press contingent turned out to view it. The car did not show and Wilson claimed that it had been sabotaged. A later court case found that he was a fraud and there was no nuclear-powered car.

Despite the shielding problem, through the late 1940s and early 1950s debate continued around the possibility of nuclear-powered cars. The development of nuclear-powered submarines and ships, and experiments to develop a nuclear-powered aircraft at that time kept the idea alive. Russian papers in the mid-1950s reported the development of a nuclear-powered car by Professor V P Romadin, but again shielding proved to be a problem. It was claimed that its laboratories had overcome the shielding problem with a new alloy that absorbed the rays.

In 1958, at the height of the 1950s American automobile culture there were at least four theoretical nuclear-powered concept cars proposed, the American Ford Nucleon and Studebaker Packard Astral, as well as the French Simca Fulgur designed by Robert Opron and the Arbel Symétric. Apart from these concept models, none were built and no automotive nuclear power plants ever made. Chrysler engineer C R Lewis had discounted the idea in 1957 because of estimates that an 80,000 lb (36,000 kg) engine would be required by a 3,000 lb (1,400 kg) car. His view was that an efficient means of storing energy was required for nuclear power to be practical. Despite this, Chrysler's stylists in 1958 drew up some possible designs.

In 1959 it was reported that Goodyear Tire and Rubber Company had developed a new rubber compound that was light and absorbed radiation, obviating the need for heavy shielding. A reporter at the time considered it might make nuclear-powered cars and aircraft a possibility.

Ford made another potentially nuclear-powered model in 1962 for the Seattle World's Fair, the Ford Seattle-ite XXI. This also never went beyond the initial concept.

In 2009, for the hundredth anniversary of General Motors' acquisition of Cadillac, Loren Kulesus created concept art depicting a car powered by thorium.

=== Other ===
The Chrysler TV-8 was an experimental concept tank designed by Chrysler in the 1950s. The tank was intended to be a nuclear-powered medium tank capable of land and amphibious warfare. The design was never mass-produced.

The X-12 was a nuclear powered locomotive, proposed in a feasibility study done in 1954 at the University of Utah.

The Mars rovers Curiosity and Perseverance are powered by a radioisotope thermoelectric generator (RTG), like the successful Viking 1 and Viking 2 Mars landers in 1976.

== See also ==
- Safe Affordable Fission Engine
- Electrically powered spacecraft propulsion
