= Antimatter propulsion spacecraft =

Rockets using antimatter as their power source

An antimatter propulsion spacecraft is a proposed hypothetical class of space technology that utilize antimatter for power within spacecraft propulsion. There are several designs that attempt to accomplish this goal.

The theoretical advantage of yield by conversion of fuel using the antimatter-matter annihilative reaction is energy production at annihilation is the maximal currently known, as the specific energy of antimatter is the most energy dense.

Certain theoretical integral antimatter thruster performances have the necessary parameters for interstellar missions.

== Annihilation ==
Protonic annihilation produces charged particles which can be confined and directed magnetically which is not the case in electronic. Antiproton annihilation reactions produce charged pions, in addition to neutrinos and gamma rays.

== Problems in design ==
The chief practical problems are creating antimatter and storing it.

=== Storage ===
Most storage schemes proposed for interstellar craft require the production of frozen pellets of antihydrogen. This requires cooling of antiprotons, binding to positrons, and capture of the resulting antihydrogen atoms - tasks which have, as of 2010, been performed only for small numbers of individual atoms. Storage of antimatter is typically done by trapping electrically charged frozen antihydrogen pellets in Penning or Paul traps. There is no theoretical barrier to these tasks being performed on the scale required to fuel an antimatter rocket. However, they are expected to be extremely (and perhaps prohibitively) expensive due to current production abilities being only able to produce small numbers of atoms.

=== Energy output effect ===
Generally, the energy from antiproton annihilation is deposited over such a large region that it cannot efficiently drive nuclear capsules. Antiproton-induced fission and self-generated magnetic fields may greatly enhance energy localization and efficient use of annihilation energy.

==== Extraction ====
A secondary problem is the extraction of useful energy or momentum from the products of antimatter annihilation, which are primarily in the form of extremely energetic ionizing radiation. The antimatter mechanisms proposed to date have for the most part provided plausible mechanisms for harnessing energy from these annihilation products. The classic rocket equation with its "wet" mass ($M_0$)(with propellant mass fraction) to "dry" mass ($M_1$)(with payload) fraction ($\frac {M_0}{M_1}$), the velocity change ($\Delta v$) and specific impulse ($I_{\text{sp}}$) no longer holds due to the mass losses occurring in antimatter annihilation.

===== Modified relativistic rocket equation =====
The loss of mass specific to antimatter annihilation requires a modification of the relativistic rocket equation given as

$\frac {M_0}{M_1} = \left(\frac{1+ \frac{\Delta v}{c}}{1- \frac{\Delta v}{c}}\right)^{\frac{c}{2 I_{\text{sp}}}}$	I

where $c$ is the speed of light, and $I_{\text{sp}}$ is the specific impulse (i.e. $I_{\text{sp}}$=0.69$c$).

The derivative form of the equation is

$\frac {dM_{\text{ship}}}{M_{\text{ship}}}= \frac {-dv ( 1 - I_{\text{sp}} \frac {v}{c^2})} {(1 - \frac {v^2}{c^2})(-\frac {I_{\text{sp}} v^2}{c^2} + (1 - a) v + a I_{\text{sp}})}$	II

where $M_{\text{ship}}$ is the non-relativistic (rest) mass of the rocket ship, and $a$ is the fraction of the original (on board) propellant mass (non-relativistic) remaining after annihilation (i.e., $a$=0.22 for the charged pions).

Eq.II is difficult to integrate analytically. If it is assumed that $v \sim I_{\text{sp}}$, such that $(1 - \frac {I_{\text{sp}} v}{c^2}) \sim (1 - \frac {v^2}{c^2})$ then the resulting equation is

$\frac {dM_{\text{ship}}}{M_{\text{ship}}}= \frac {-dv}{(-\frac {I_{\text{sp}} v^2}{c^2} + (1 - a) v + a I_{\text{sp}})}$	III

Eq.III can be integrated and the integral evaluated for $M_0$ and $M_1$, and initial and final velocities ($v_i = 0$ and $v_f = \Delta v$). The resulting relativistic rocket equation with loss of propellant is

$\frac{M_0}{M_1}=\left(\frac{(-2I_{\text{sp}}\Delta v/c^2+1-a-\sqrt{(1-a)^2+4aI_{\text{sp}}^2/c^2})(1-a+\sqrt{(1-a)^2+4aI_{\text{sp}}^2/c^2})}{(-2I_{\text{sp}}\Delta v/c^2+1-a+\sqrt{(1-a)^2+4aI_{\text{sp}}^2/c^2})(1-a-\sqrt{(1-a)^2+4aI_{\text{sp}}^2/c^2})}\right)^{\frac{1}{\sqrt{(1-a)^2+4aI_{\text{sp}}^2/c^2}}}$	IV

==== Radiation damage ====
Another general problem with high powered propulsion is excess heat or waste heat, and as with antimatter-matter annihilation also includes extreme radiation. A proton-antiproton annihilation propulsion system transforms 39% of the propellant mass into an intense high-energy flux of gamma radiation. The gamma rays and the high-energy charged pions will cause heating and radiation damage if they are not shielded against. Unlike neutrons, they will not cause the exposed material to become radioactive by transmutation of the nuclei. The components needing shielding are the crew, the electronics, the cryogenic tankage, and the magnetic coils for magnetically assisted rockets. Two types of shielding are needed: radiation protection and thermal protection (different from Heat shield or thermal insulation).

=== Relativity ===
Finally, relativistic considerations have to be taken into account. As the by products of annihilation move at relativistic velocities the rest mass changes according to relativistic mass–energy. For example, the total mass–energy content of the neutral pion is converted into gammas, not just its rest mass. It is necessary to use a relativistic rocket equation that takes into account the relativistic effects of both the vehicle and propellant exhaust (charged pions) moving near the speed of light. These two modifications to the two rocket equations result in a mass ratio ($\frac {M_0}{M_1}$) for a given ($\Delta v$) and ($I_{\text{sp}}$) that is much higher for a relativistic antimatter rocket than for either a classical or relativistic "conventional" rocket.

=== Other general issues ===
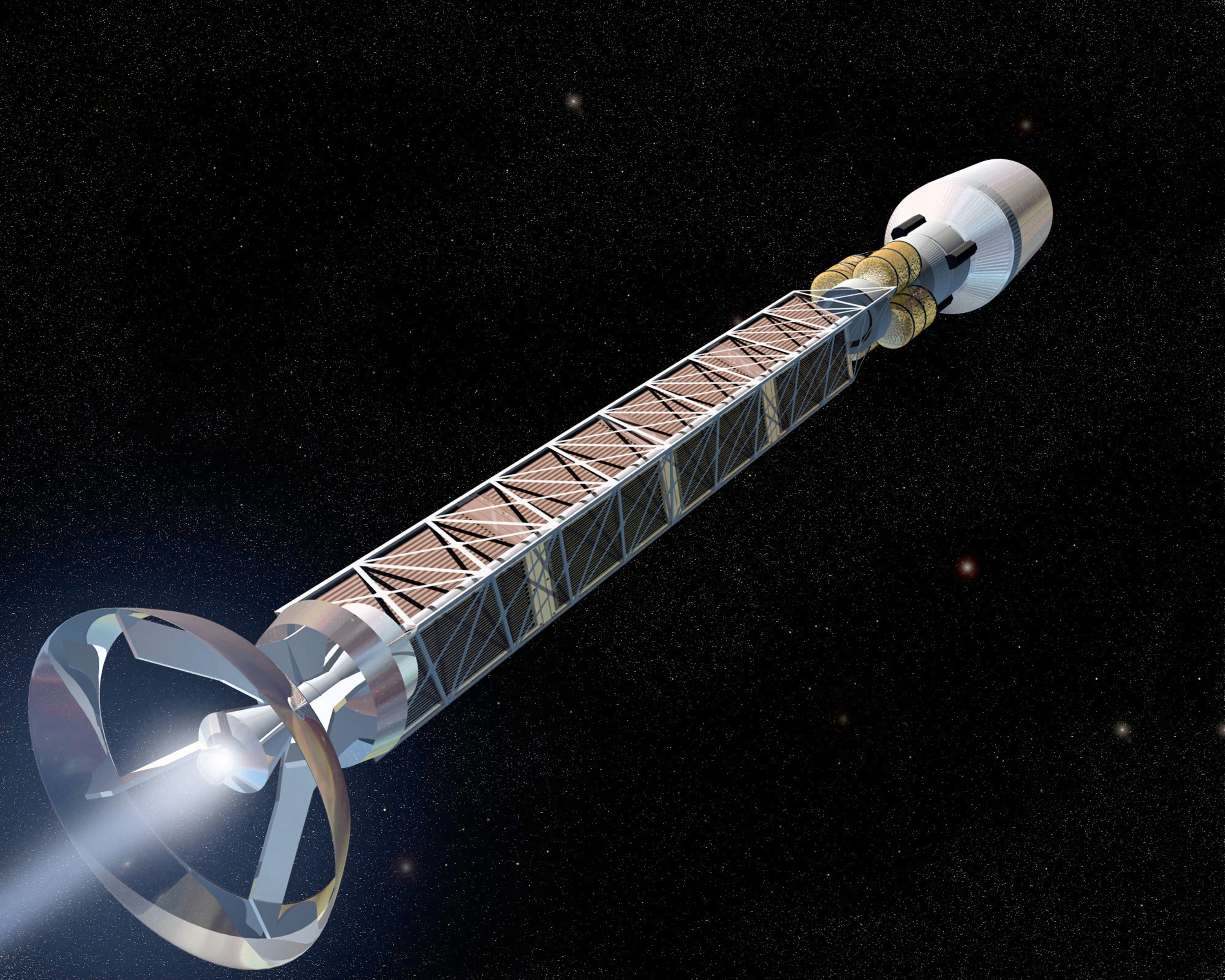
A proposed antimatter rocket

The cosmic background hard radiation will ionize the rocket's hull over time and poses a health threat. Also, gas plasma interactions may cause space charge. The major interaction of concern is differential charging of various parts of a spacecraft, leading to high electric fields and arcing between spacecraft components. This can be resolved with well placed plasma contactor. However, there is no solution yet for when plasma contactors are turned off to allow maintenance work on the hull. Long term space flight at interstellar velocities causes erosion of the rocket's hull due to collision with particles, gas, dust and micrometeorites. At 0.2$c$ for a 6 light year distance, erosion is estimated to be in the order of about 30 kg/m^{2} or about 1 cm of aluminum shielding.

== Antimatter production ==
=== Cost ===
The estimated cost of one gram of antimatter during the fall of 2003 was 62.5 trillion dollars. Energy expenditure during 2011 for CERN 1g was stated as 25 million billion kWh costing more than 1 million billion Euros. (Note: This is equivalent to $1.392 quadrillion (2011 prices)) In 2019 within CERN 1g was stated as being $2700 trillion. (Note: An estimated requirement for return journey to Jupiter with a payload of 10 - 100 metric tons is 1 - 10 micrograms. 1 microgram of antimatter 2003 is $62.5 million, CERN costs would be approximately $2.7 billion; estimated. $$V 2026=V 2003 / 2019\times \frac {CPI2026} {CPI2003 / 2019}$$ CPI 2003 is 184.000, 2019 is 255.658, 2026 is 324.122 2026 cost of 2003 is $109.22 million; of 2019 is 3.423 billion.)

==== Potentially viable ====
Cost of feasible (nuclear propulsive) quantities of available antimatter was estimated in 1999 as both $60 million per mission and $6.4 million (max.). (Note: The cost of 2003-2026 production of PC antimatter is estimated as 4.3688 quadrillion dollars which is 4.3688 × 10^{15} ($4,368,800,000,000,000))

=== Rate ===
The production rate of antimatter at CERN during 2009 was from 0.000000001 (1 billionth) to 0.00000001 (10 billionths) of a gram per year.

==== Non-viable ====
The antimatter requirement for a beamed-core power source for transit to the nearest star — Proxima Centuri (4.2 light years away) — is approximately 40 metric tonnes. (Note: The estimated time taken for PC mission generation at best-case 2009 rate of production is 4 quadrillion years)

== Propulsion design ==
=== System ===
The propulsion system is:

1. Premade and, or, an onboard antimatter generator (Note: An antiproton flux produced by spallation exists in interstellar medium cosmic rays)
2. Storage
3. A way to separate or extract a certain amount of antimatter from the storage mass at the necessary rate
4. Generation of motion of antimatter as transferal to the annihilation location
5. An annihilation chamber
6. Control or channel of antimatter products as thrust

=== Methods ===
Theoretical antimatter inclusion propellant methods:

Beam: annihilation product only
Nuclear hybrid: with fusion and (Note: Which is: fission instigates fusion) or fission:

antiparticles to create or catalyse a reaction
radioisotope

Thermal:

plasma core
solid core

annihilation particles contained within the propulsion generator and controlled for heating a rocket working fluid

using conventional propellants: carbon dioxide, hydrogen, methane, water

electricity generation

using electro-thruster types: arcjet, gridded ion, Hall thruster

The alternatives to direct antimatter annihilation propulsion offer the possibility of feasible vehicles with, in some cases, vastly smaller amounts of antimatter but require a lot more matter propellant.

==== Beam antimatter rocket: direct use of reaction products ====
Charged pions can be channelled by a magnetic nozzle, producing thrust. This type of antimatter rocket is a pion rocket or beamed core configuration.

Positron annihilation has also been proposed for rocketry. Annihilation of positrons produces only gamma rays. Early proposals for this type of rocket, such as those developed by Eugen Sänger, assumed the use of some material that could reflect gamma rays, used as a light sail or parabolic shield to derive thrust from the annihilation reaction, but no known form of matter (consisting of atoms or ions) interacts with gamma rays in a manner that would enable specular reflection. The momentum of gamma rays can, however, be partially transferred to matter by Compton scattering.

One method to reach relativistic velocities uses a matter-antimatter GeV gamma ray laser photon rocket made possible by a relativistic proton-antiproton pinch discharge, where the recoil from the laser beam is transmitted by the Mössbauer effect to the spacecraft.

A new annihilation process has purportedly been developed by researchers from the University of Gothenburg, Sweden. Several annihilation reactors have been constructed in the past years which attempted to convert hydrogen or deuterium into relativistic particles through laser annihilation. The technology was explored by research groups led by Prof. Leif Holmlid and Sindre Zeiner-Gundersen, and a third relativistic particle reactor is currently being built at the University of Iceland. In theory, emitted particles from hydrogen annihilation processes could reach 0.94c and can be used in space propulsion. However the veracity of Holmlid's research is under dispute and no successful implementations have been peer reviewed or replicated.

==== Nuclear catalyzed fission/fusion or spiked fusion ====
This is a hybrid approach in which antiprotons are used to catalyze a fission/fusion reaction or to "spike" the propulsion of a fusion rocket or any similar applications.

The antiproton-driven Inertial confinement fusion (ICF) Rocket concept uses pellets for the D-T reaction. The pellet consists of a hemisphere of fissionable material such as U^{235} with a hole through which a pulse of antiprotons and positrons is injected. It is surrounded by a hemisphere of fusion fuel, for example deuterium-tritium, or lithium deuteride. Antiproton annihilation occurs at the surface of the hemisphere, which ionizes the fuel. These ions heat the core of the pellet to fusion temperatures.

The antiproton-driven Magnetically Insulated Inertial Confinement Fusion Propulsion (MICF) concept relies on self-generated magnetic field which insulates the plasma from the metallic shell that contains it during the burn. The lifetime of the plasma was estimated to be two orders of magnitude greater than implosion inertial fusion, which corresponds to a longer burn time, and hence, greater gain.

The antimatter-driven P-B^{11} concept uses antiprotons to ignite the P-B^{11} reactions in an MICF scheme. Excessive radiation losses are a major obstacle to ignition and require modifying the particle density, and plasma temperature to increase the gain. It was concluded that it is entirely feasible that this system could achieve I_{sp}~10^{5}s.

A different approach was envisioned for AIMStar in which small fusion fuel droplets would be injected into a cloud of antiprotons confined in a very small volume within a reaction Penning trap. Annihilation takes place on the surface of the antiproton cloud, peeling back 0.5% of the cloud. The power density released is roughly comparable to a 1 kJ, 1 ns laser depositing its energy over a 200 μm ICF target.

The ICAN-II project employs the antiproton catalyzed microfission (ACMF) concept which uses pellets with a molar ratio of 9:1 of D-T:U^{235} for nuclear pulse propulsion.

==== Thermal antimatter rocket: heating of a propellant ====
This type of antimatter rocket is termed a thermal antimatter rocket as the energy or heat from the annihilation is harnessed to create an exhaust from non-exotic material or propellant.

The solid core concept uses antiprotons to heat a solid, high-atomic weight (Z), refractory metal core. Propellant is pumped into the hot core and expanded through a nozzle to generate thrust. The performance of this concept is roughly equivalent to that of the nuclear thermal rocket ($I_{\text{sp}}$ ~ 10^{3} sec) due to temperature limitations of the solid. However, the antimatter energy conversion and heating efficiencies are typically high due to the short mean path between collisions with core atoms (efficiency $\eta_e$ ~ 85%). Several methods for the liquid-propellant thermal antimatter engine using the gamma rays produced by antiproton or positron annihilation have been proposed. These methods resemble those proposed for nuclear thermal rockets. One proposed method is to use positron annihilation gamma rays to heat a solid engine core. Hydrogen gas is ducted through this core, heated, and expelled from a rocket nozzle. A second proposed engine type uses positron annihilation within a solid lead pellet or within compressed xenon gas to produce a cloud of hot gas, which heats a surrounding layer of gaseous hydrogen. Direct heating of the hydrogen by gamma rays was considered impractical, due to the difficulty of compressing enough of it within an engine of reasonable size to absorb the gamma rays. A third proposed engine type uses annihilation gamma rays to heat an ablative sail, with the ablated material providing thrust. As with nuclear thermal rockets, the specific impulse achievable by these methods is limited by materials considerations, typically being in the range of 1000–2000 seconds.

The gaseous core system substitutes the low-melting point solid with a high temperature gas (i.e. tungsten gas/plasma), thus permitting higher operational temperatures and performance ($I_{\text{sp}}$ ~ 2 × 10^{3} sec). However, the longer mean free path for thermalization and absorption results in much lower energy conversion efficiencies ($\eta_e$ ~ 35%).

The plasma core allows the gas to ionize and operate at even higher effective temperatures. Heat loss is suppressed by magnetic confinement in the reaction chamber and nozzle. Although performance is extremely high ($I_{\text{sp}}$ ~ 10^{4}-10^{5} sec), the long mean free path results in very low energy utilization ($\eta_e$ ~ 10%).

===== Electro =====
The idea of using antimatter to power an electric space drive has also been proposed. These proposed designs are typically similar to those suggested for nuclear electric rockets. Antimatter annihilations are used to directly or indirectly heat a working fluid, as in a nuclear thermal rocket, but the fluid is used to generate electricity, which is then used to power some form of electric space propulsion system. The resulting system shares many of the characteristics of other charged particle/electric propulsion proposals, that typically being high specific impulse and low thrust (see also antimatter power generation).

=== Relative powers ===
==== Efficiency ====
Beam: 100% mass=energy though estimated 70% available. Proton-Antiproton annihilation (pp̅ annihilation) estimated utilisable product-energy per stage of three product types: pion, 40% of energy caused by initial annihilation at this product stage is utilisable, muon 31%, positron-electron 16% Not perfectly efficient; energy is lost as the rest mass of the charged (22.3%) and uncharged pions (14.38%), lost as the kinetic energy of the uncharged pions (which can't be deflected for thrust); and lost as neutrinos and gamma rays (see antimatter as fuel).
Fission: (using uranium) 0.1% mass post reaction outputs energy. Catalysticalized anti-protonic neutron output is a range of a six-multiple of the power of conventional process.

==== Thrust speed ====
Beam
Keane et al 2012: Monte Carlo simulation using Geant4: v_{e} ~ 0.69c. I_{sp} (Note: I_{sp} is Impulse (I) + specific (_{sp})) is 2.8 × 10^{7} seconds (s) (Note: (10^{7} s being 0.33c))
Nuclear pulse
Schmidt et al 1999: 13600 - 67000s I_{sp}

== See also ==
- Nuclear photonic rocket
