= Deep space exploration =

Branch of astronomy

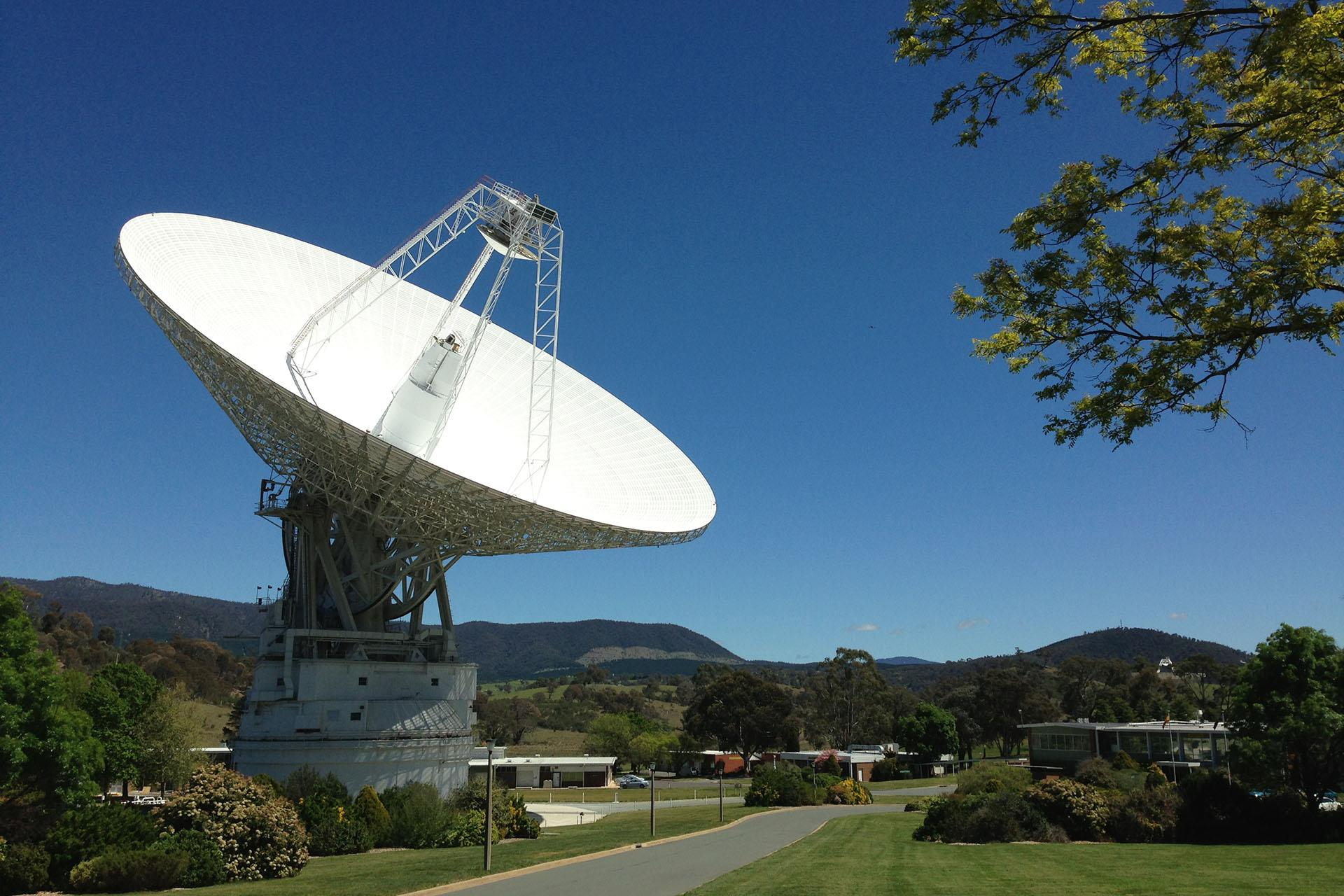
70-meter-wide radio antenna at the Deep Space Network's Canberra facility in Australia

Deep space exploration is the branch of astronomy, astronautics, and space technology that is involved with exploring the distant regions of outer space. However, little consensus has been reached on the meaning of "distant" regions. In some contexts, it is used to refer to interstellar space. The International Telecommunication Union defines deep space to start at a distance of 2 million km (1.2 million mi) (about 0.01 AU) from Earth's surface. NASA's Deep Space Network has variously used criteria of 16,000–32,000 km (10,000–20,000 mi) from Earth. Physical exploration of space is conducted both by human spaceflights (deep-space astronautics) and by robotic spacecraft.

At present the farthest space probe humankind has constructed and launched from Earth is Voyager 1, which was announced on December 5, 2011, to have reached the outer edge of the Solar System, and entered interstellar space on August 25, 2012. Deep space exploration further than this vessel's capacity is not yet possible due to limitations in the propulsion technology currently available.

Some of the best candidates for future deep space engine technologies include nuclear fusion propulsion, laser/maser propulsion, and antimatter. The latter, beamed propulsion, appears to be the best candidate for deep space exploration presently available, since it uses known physics and known technology that is being developed for other purposes.

== Current research ==
In 2012, the Defense Advanced Research Projects Agency announced the award of $500,000 to former astronaut Mae Jemison to fund a project with the goal of sending future astronauts out of the Solar System. Jemison aims to increase public interest in future deep space exploration projects. Upon awarding the money to Jemison, a "100 Year Starship" symposium was held in Houston, Texas, to discuss interstellar travel. Topics discussed include "time-distance solutions, life sciences in space exploration, destinations and habitats, becoming an interstellar civilization, space technologies enhancing life on Earth, and commercial opportunities from interstellar efforts".

Research in deep space is ongoing and rapidly developing. In 2011, after the retirement of the Space Shuttle, NASA announced its intentions to invest money into developing three technologies vital to deep space exploration. The "must-have technologies" include a deep space atomic clock, a large solar sail and a more advanced laser communications system to improve communication, navigation, and propulsion in future missions. In June 2013, NASA announced the selection of eight American astronauts that will begin to train for future deep space missions beyond low Earth orbit. NASA intends that these eight astronauts to train for future Mars or asteroid travel.

== See also ==
- Intergalactic travel
- Interplanetary spaceflight
- Interstellar travel
- List of artificial objects leaving the Solar System
- Space colonization
