= Arbel (automobile) =

The Arbel (also called Loubières, Loubière, Symétric, Symétric-Paris, or Arbel-Symétric) was a fiber-glass bodied hybrid petrol-electric vehicle produced by the Compagnie Normande d'Etudes pour l'Application de Procédés Mécaniques made as individual models from 1951 to 1953 and again 1957 to 1959. Only a limited number were made throughout the period, mainly for experimentation or prototyping.

== First version - 1951 to 1953 ==
The first Arbel was designed and made by Casimir (Casi) André Loubière, then a 43-year-old car salesman, and financed by his brother Maurice, the owner of an air-transport business, COSARA (Société Transatlantique Aérienne en Extrême Orient), in Indo-China. They initially traded as Les Freres Loubière.

The car was described as an eight-seater powered by a Simca four cylinder 1100cc 45 hp (34 kW) petrol engine that powered four electric motors fitted to the inside of the wheel hubs. It was built of glass and light alloy, weighed 1,870lb, and had windows that were curved and slid into the roof. The brothers stated that they intended the car to be mass-produced and sell for £295. It was first shown as the Symétrie at the Geneva Motor Show in 1951, but created little interest.

The car was redesigned as a roadster with a plastic body and re-shown during the Paris Grand Palais 40th Salon d'Automobile and Cycle Show on 22 October 1953. At that time it was stated as being of interest to the French War Department. It had one pedal, a handbrake for emergencies, and no gears. The body was fibreglass. Normal braking was automatic when the accelerator was not pressed. The Loubières drove the car in Paris, where it reached 60 mph. It was said to be able to attain a top speed of 95 mph and petrol consumption was 32 mpg under normal driving. The stopping distance at 60 mph was said to be less than 40 yards, compared with the 60 to 80 yards for cars of the period. With a proposed annual production of 1,000 cars, the Symetric was estimated to cost £435.

== Second version - 1957 to 1958 ==
The second version was designed between 1957 and 1958. It was displayed at the March 1958 Geneva Motor Show.

Called the Arbel-Symétric, alternative power plants were considered, the first was a static gas generator fueled by diesel oil and the second in 1958, possibly taking the idea from the Ford Nucleon, was to be powered by a "genestatom", a 40-KW nuclear thermal generator using radioactive cartridges made of nuclear waste. The French government did not approve the use of nuclear fuel and no development took place.

The 1958 Geneva show also had the Studebaker-Packard Astral, another concept car with the idea of nuclear propulsion, on display.

The company went into debt and never recovered. In 1963 the Loubières patented a rotary engine, although this may have related to their engine patented on 13 June 1950.

== Photographs ==
- First version
- Second version

== See also ==
- Nuclear propulsion
