= C11H8N2 =

The molecular formula C_{11}H_{8}N_{2} (molar mass: 168.19 g/mol, exact mass: 168.0687 u) may refer to:

- β-Carboline (9H-pyrido[3,4-b]indole), or norharmane
- γ-Carboline
- 1-Isocyano-5-aminonaphthalene
