= Johndale Solem =

American theoretical physicist

Johndale C. Solem
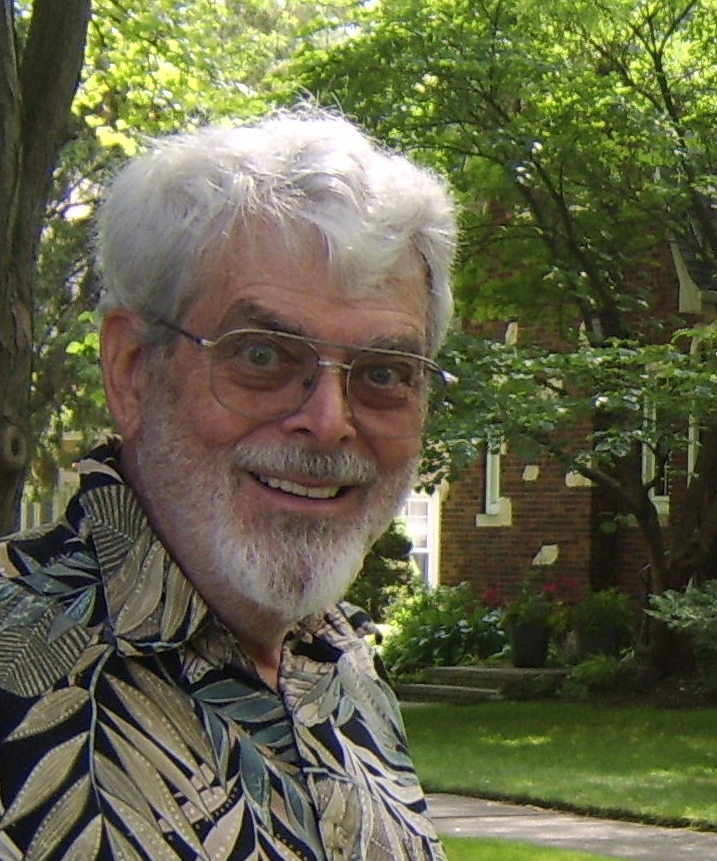
- Solem in September 2014
- Born: 1941 (age 84–85)
- Education: Yale University
- Scientific career
- Fields: Atomic and nuclear experimental and theoretical physics
- Workplaces: Los Alamos National Laboratory
- Doctoral advisor: Glen A. Rebka, Jr.

Johndale C. Solem (born 1941) is an American theoretical physicist and Fellow of Los Alamos National Laboratory. Solem has authored or co-authored over 185 technical papers in many different scientific fields. He is best known for his work on avoiding comet or asteroid collisions with Earth and on interstellar spacecraft propulsion.

== Education and career ==
At Yale University, Johndale C. Solem earned his B.S. cum laude in Physics in 1963 and his Ph.D. in physics in 1968. His Ph.D. thesis work under Glen A. Rebka, Jr. was on dynamic nuclear polarization in deuterium hydride. He then joined the Theoretical Division of Los Alamos Scientific Laboratory (subsequently known as Los Alamos National Laboratory) in New Mexico (1969-2000).

Concurrently with his research, Solem held several management positions (1971-1988). Some of his appointments were: Group Leader of Thermonuclear Weapons Physics, Group Leader of Neutron Physics, Group Leader of High-Energy-Density Physics, Deputy Division Leader of Physics, and Associate Division Leader of Theory.

Shortly after the breakup of the Soviet Union, Solem led a U.S./Russia joint collaboration of scientists in an effort to obtain good science and to improve US/Russia relations.

Solem served on the U. S. Air Force Scientific Advisory Board (1971-1978) and several DoD and DOE committees advising on science policy. He was Los Alamos' representative to the national missile Site Defense Systems Planning Study. He served on the Los Alamos Weapons Program Review Committee and high-level committees setting the direction of nuclear weapons development (1971-1988). Solem headed the Los Alamos Postdoctoral Research Program (1972-1978) and authored the program's charter, which is still in effect.

While a consultant to the RAND Corporation in Santa Monica, CA (1987-2005), he conducted research on antimatter technology and microrobotics, as well as national security issues. As a consultant to the University of Illinois at Chicago (1987-1988), his research involved x-ray lasers and microholography.

== Scientific contributions ==
Solem's research activities have involved experimental, computational, and theoretical physics and mathematics, as well as other areas of science, including magnetism; particle and radiation transport; plasma physics; nuclear physics; nuclear explosive theory; equations-of-state; artificial intelligence and robotics; computational science; x-ray microholography; antiproton science and technology; mathematical physics; astrophysics; exotic methods of spacecraft propulsion; the foundations of quantum mechanics; and laser theory, particularly as it applies to conceptual designs for the gamma-ray laser.

=== Comets and asteroids ===
Solem's work on the interception and deflection of comets and asteroids on collision course with Earth (1993a, 2000) also led to a theory of the origin of the shape of rubble-pile asteroids. His analytic theory of the breakup of comets by planetary tidal forces resulted in his calculation of the diameter and density of the parent comet of Shoemaker-Levy 9 as it was before breaking up in the tidal field of Jupiter in 1994 (1994a).

=== Nuclear plasma pulse propulsion for interplanetary space travel ===
Solem's research on interplanetary travel culminated in his MEDUSA concept, a nuclear explosive propelled spacecraft for interplanetary space travel (1994b). Gregory Matloff said this was "a surprising [propulsion] concept which might greatly reduce spacecraft mass." The concept inspired research and elaboration by the aerospace community.

At the behest of NASA's Breakthrough Propulsion Physics Project, Solem investigated whether a nuclear external pulsed plasma propelled (EPPP) interstellar probe could reach Alpha Centauri in 40 years, the average length of a scientist's career. No scheme could be found, even involving elaborate staging, that could accelerate such a vehicle much beyond 1% the speed of light.

=== Quantum mechanics ===
Solem discovered a strange polarization of the hydrogen atom that, contrary to intuition, drove electron orbits perpendicular to an applied electric field (1987).

He elucidated the interpretation of geometric phase in quantum mechanics by showing the invalidity of superposition of quantal states, the distinction between rays and vectors in projective Hilbert space, and the meaning of resultant singularities (1993b). Using the symmetry of the Kepler Orbital Problem in operator formalism for both classical and quantum mechanics, Solem predicted a previously unknown elastic scattering process that will rotate the linear polarization of the scattered photon by ½$\pi$ (1997a).

=== Continuum mechanics ===
Solem examined the fundamental nature of foams under compression and showed a general hyperbolic stress-strain relation (1999).

=== Physical and chemical phenomena at extremely high magnetic fields ===
Solem provided leadership for a series of pioneering experiments, known as the Dirac Project, that used capacitor banks and Russian designed and built high-explosive-driven flux compression devices to investigate physical and chemical phenomena at extremely high magnetic fields and pressures (1997b). These experiments were an international collaboration of scientists from Russia, Germany, Japan, Australia, Belgium, several American universities, and Los Alamos National Laboratory.

=== Gamma-ray lasers ===
Solem contributed to many innovations in gamma-ray laser (graser) research, publishing more than a dozen papers over a period of twenty years.

=== Laser-driven shock waves ===
Solem and colleagues performed the first laser-driven experiments on shock-wave structure (1977, 1978) and the first impedance-match experiments.

=== Advanced lasers of extremely short wave lengths ===
While on sabbatical at the University of Illinois at Chicago (1987-1988), Solem engaged in research with academic colleagues to probe the limits starting with a large krypton-fluoride excimer laser at the university's laser laboratory, which would produce short intense pulses of 248-nm radiation. He and his colleagues investigated many-electron motions in multiphoton ionization and excitation, fifth-harmonic production in neon and argon, strong-field processes in the ultraviolet, generation of very short wavelengths in BaF_{2}, which produced x-rays 9-13 Å and the kinetic energy distributions of ionic fragments produced by subpicosecond multiphoton ionization of N_{2} (1988a, 1989b, 1991a).

=== X-ray microholography ===
Solem wrote a paper on the use of x-ray microholography to image biological specimens (1982). As a result, this early work, research in pursuit of x-ray holography has continued at University of California at Berkeley, University of Illinois, Lawrence Livermore National Laboratory, industrial firms, and in France and Germany. Solem observed that by using intense, pulsed coherent x-ray sources, it is possible to obtain magnified three-dimensional images of elementary biological structures in the living state (1996a).

=== Theory of high-intensity laser-beam self-channeling ===
While at the University of Illinois at Chicago, Solem and colleagues developed an analytic theory of charge-displacement self-channeling as a mechanism to extend atomic lasers to higher quantum energy and then broadened this theory to the development of KeV-range laboratory x-ray lasers (1989c, 1994d).

=== Robotics ===
Solem created a high-level programming language for controlling personal robots. In addition to initiating a laboratory program in artificial intelligence and robotics, Solem did "pioneering" calculations on the motility of microrobots (1994e). He showed unique mechanisms for self-assembly of motile microrobots based on Platonic solids, in particular the dodecahedron, which can assemble into a helix appropriate for propulsion at high-Reynolds number (2002). He described several microrobots for military applications (1996b).

=== Advanced computers ===
In addition to organizing and leading the development of several large-scale physics application computer codes, Solem developed a concept for massively parallel supercomputer architecture specialized for Monte Carlo solution of integro-differential equations (1985a, 1985b).

=== National defense policy ===
Solem developed ideas regarding nuclear deterrence for national defense policy (1974, 1981b).

=== Nuclear technology research and pure nuclear fusion ===
Solem contributed ideas of using beta-particle spectroscopy to measure mix processes in National Ignition Facility (NIF) microcapsules in 2006.

=== Universal origin of life ===
Solem worked on a universal, astrophysically based theory of the origin of life by natural processes arising from non-living matter starting with the minimum possible information, or the minimum possible departure from thermodynamic equilibrium, along with thermodynamically free energy. He developed underlying physical criteria for the minimum size necessary for molecules in order to become self-replicating (2003a).

=== Antimatter science and technology ===
Solem worked out techniques to use very small quantities of antiprotons stored in a Penning trap, or similar charged-particle storage device, to perform Lilliputian experiments in high energy density physics, including opacity and equation-of-state measurements (1988b, 1990).

He worked on spacecraft propulsion using antimatter. He developed the re-entrant-$\pi$ scheme for the efficient use of antiproton annihilation energy (1991b), while consulting for the RAND Corporation.

=== Mathematics ===
Solem collaborated on the development of pseudo characteristic functions of convex polyhedra, a result providing rapid regional particle location in Monte Carlo calculations (2003b).

== Cited papers ==
- Solem, J. C. (1974). "Tactical nuclear deterrence". Los Alamos Scientific Laboratory Report LA-74-1362.
- Solem, J. C.; Veeser, L. (1977). "Exploratory laser-driven shock wave studies" (PDF). Los Alamos Scientific Laboratory Report LA-6997. 79: 14376. Bibcode:1977STIN...7914376S. doi:10.2172/5313279.
- Veeser, L. R.; Solem, J. C. (1978). "Studies of Laser-driven shock waves in aluminum". Physical Review Letters. 40 (21): 1391. Bibcode:1978PhRvL..40.1391V. doi:10.1103/physrevlett.40.1391.
- Solem, J. C. (1979). "On the feasibility of an impulsively driven gamma-ray laser". Los Alamos Scientific Laboratory Report LA-7898. OSTI 6010532.
- Baldwin, G. C.; Solem, J. C.; Gol'danskii, V. I. (1981a). "Approaches to the development of gamma-ray lasers". Reviews of Modern Physics. 53 (4): 687–744. Bibcode:1981RvMP...53..687B. doi:10.1103/revmodphys.53.687.
- Teller, E.; Solem, J. C. (1981b). "Hardware Stores" (PDF). Symposium on National Defense. Hoover Institution Archives, Stanford University. Executive, Schmotter, James W. Ed. Graduate School of Business and Public Administration at Cornell University. 8 (1): 29–30.
- Solem, J. C.; Baldwin, G. C. (1982). "Microholography of living organisms". Science. 218 (4569): 229–235. Bibcode:1982Sci...218..229S. doi:10.1126/science.218.4569.229. PMID 17838608. S2CID 32381820.
- Solem, J. C.; Chapline, G. F. (1984). "X-ray biomicroholography". Optical Engineering. 23 (2): 193. Bibcode:1984OptEn..23..193S. doi:10.1117/12.7973410.
- Solem, J. C. (1985). "MECA: A multiprocessor concept specialized to Monte Carlo". Monte-Carlo Methods and Applications in Neutronics, Photonics and Statistical Physics. Lecture Notes in Physics. Vol. 240. Proceedings of the Joint los Alamos National Laboratory - Commissariat à l'Energie Atomique Meeting Held at Cadarache Castle, Provence, France April 22–26, 1985; Monte-Carlo Methods and Applications in Neutronics, Photonics and Statistical Physics, Alcouffe, R.; Dautray, R.; Forster, A.; Forster, G.; Mercier, B.; Eds. (Springer Verlag, Berlin). pp. 184–195. Bibcode:1985LNP...240..184S. doi:10.1007/BFb0049047. ISBN 978-3-540-16070-0. OSTI 5689714.
- Solem, J. C.; Metropolis, N. (1985b). "Contribution on massively parallel automation and robotics" (PDF). An Independent Study of Automation and Robotics for the National Space Program by the Automation and Robotics Panel, California Space Institute, Cal Space Report CSI/85-01, University of California, February 25, 1985.
- Solem, J. C. (1986). "Imaging biological specimens with high-intensity soft X-rays". Journal of the Optical Society of America B. 3 (11): 1551–1565. Bibcode:1986JOSAB...3.1551S. doi:10.1364/josab.3.001551.
- Solem, J. C. (1987). "The strange polarization of the classical atom". American Journal of Physics. 55 (10): 906–909. Bibcode:1987AmJPh..55..906S. doi:10.1119/1.14951.
- Rosman, R.; Gibson, G.; Boyer, K.; Jara, H.; Luk, T. S.; McIntyre, I.; McPherson, A.; Solem, J. C.; Rhodes, C. K. (1988a). "Fifth-harmonic production in neon and argon with picosecond 248-nm radiation". Journal of the Optical Society of America B. 5 (6): 1237–1242. Bibcode:1988JOSAB...5.1237R. doi:10.1364/josab.5.001237.
- Solem, J. C. (1988b). "Extreme states of matter: Could antiprotons be used to power table-top equation of state or opacity experiments?". Proceedings of the Antiproton Science and Technology Workshop, Santa Monica, CA, October 6–9, 1987, the Rand Corporation, Augenstein, B.; Bonner, B.; Mills, F.; Nieto, M.; Eds. (Defense Technical Information Center): 502–529.
- Biedenharn, L. C.; Rinker, G. A.; Solem, J. C. (1989a). "A solvable approximate model for the response of atoms subjected to strong oscillatory electric fields". Journal of the Optical Society of America B. 6 (2): 221–227. Bibcode:1989JOSAB...6..221B. doi:10.1364/josab.6.000221.
- Boyer, K.; Luk, T. S.; Solem, J. C.; Rhodes, C. K. (1989b). "Kinetic energy distributions of ionic fragments produced by subpicosecond multiphoton ionization of N_{2}". Physical Review A. 39 (3): 1186–1192. Bibcode:1989PhRvA..39.1186B. doi:10.1103/physreva.39.1186. PMID 9901355.
- Solem, J. C.; Luk, T. S.; Boyer, K.; Rhodes, C. K. (1989c). "Prospects for X-ray amplification with charge-displacement self channeling". IEEE Journal of Quantum Electronics. 25 (12): 2423–2430. Bibcode:1989IJQE...25.2423S. doi:10.1109/3.40625.
- Augenstein, B. W.; Solem, J. C.; Lukasik, S.; Smith, G. (1990). Antiproton research, science, and technological applications: Relevance to DoD. Report ND-3456-SDI (Report). Santa Monica, CA: The RAND Corporation.
- Zigler, A.; Burkhalter, P. G.; Nagel, D. J.; Boyer, K.; Luk, T. S.; McPherson, A.; Solem, J. C.; Rhodes, C. K. (1991a). "High intensity generation of 9–13 Å x-rays from BaF_{2} targets". Applied Physics Letters. 59 (7): 777. Bibcode:1991ApPhL..59..777Z. doi:10.1063/1.106384.
- Solem, J. C. (1991b) "Prospects for efficient use of annihilation energy". Fusion Technology 20: 1040–1045. (see also Program and Abstracts for ICENES '91 Sixth International Conference on Emerging Nuclear Energy Systems, June 16–21, 1991, Monterey, CA).
- Canavan, G. H.; Solem, J. C.; Rather, D. G. (1992a). "Proceedings of the Near-Earth-Object Interception Workshop, January 14-16, 1992, Los Alamos, NM". Los Alamos National Laboratory LA--12476-C.
- Haddad, W. S.; Cullen, D.; Solem, J. C.; Longworth, J.; McPherson, A.; Boyer, K.; Rhodes, C. K. (1992b). "Fourier-transform holographic microscope". Applied Optics. 31 (24): 4973–4978. Bibcode:1992ApOpt..31.4973H. doi:10.1364/ao.31.004973. PMID 20733659.
- Solem, J. C. (1993a). "Interception of comets and asteroids on collision course with Earth". Journal of Spacecraft and Rockets. 30 (2): 222–228. Bibcode:1993JSpRo..30..222S. doi:10.2514/3.11531. OSTI 10123149.
- Solem, J. C.; Biedenharn, L. C. (1993b). "Understanding geometrical phases in quantum mechanics: An elementary example". Foundations of Physics. 23 (2): 185–195. Bibcode:1993FoPh...23..185S. doi:10.1007/bf01883623. S2CID 121930907.
- Solem, J. C. (1994a). "Density and size of Comet Shoemaker–Levy 9 deduced from a tidal breakup model". Nature. 370 (6488): 349–351. Bibcode:1994Natur.370..349S. doi:10.1038/370349a0. S2CID 4313295.
- Solem, J. C. (June 1994b). "Nuclear explosive propulsion for interplanetary travel: Extension of the Medusa concept for higher specific impulse". Journal of the British Interplanetary Society. 47 (6): 229–238. Bibcode:1994JBIS...47..229S. ISSN 0007-084X.
- Baldwin, G. C.; Solem, J. C. (1994c). "The futility of observing stimulated gamma-ray emission from a long-lived isomeric state". Il Nuovo Cimento. 16D (6): 627–630. Bibcode:1994NCimD..16..627B. doi:10.1007/BF02451661. S2CID 121204293.
- Borisov, A. B.; Shi, X.; Karpov, V. B.; Korobkin, V.; Solem, J. C.; Shiryaev, O. B.; McPherson, A.; Boyer, K.; Rhodes, C. K. (1994d). "Stable self-channeling of intense ultraviolet pulses in underdense plasma producing channels exceeding 100 Rayleigh lengths". Journal of the Optical Society of America B. 11 (10): 1941–1947. Bibcode:1994JOSAB..11.1941B. doi:10.1364/josab.11.001941.
- Solem, J. C. (1994e). "The motility of microrobots". Artificial Life III: Proceedings of the Workshop on Artificial Life, June 1992, Santa Fe, NM, Langton, C., Ed.; Santa Fe Institute Studies in the Sciences of Complexity (Addison-Wesley, Reading, MA). 17: 359–380.
- Boyer, K.; Solem, J. C.; Longworth, J.; Borisov, A.; Rhodes, C. K. (1996a). "Biomedical three-dimensional holographic microimaging at visible, ultraviolet and X-ray wavelengths". Nature Medicine. 2 (8): 939–941. doi:10.1038/nm0896-939. PMID 8705867. S2CID 25231033.
- Solem, J. C. (1996b). "The application of microrobotics in warfare". Los Alamos National Laboratory Technical Report LAUR-96-3067. doi:10.2172/369704.
- Solem, J. C. (1997a). "Variations on the Kepler problem". Foundations of Physics. 27 (9): 1291–1306. Bibcode:1997FoPh...27.1291S. doi:10.1007/bf02551529. S2CID 122304711.
- Solem, J. C.; Sheppard, M. G. (1997b). "Experimental quantum chemistry at ultrahigh magnetic fields: Some opportunities". International Journal of Quantum Chemistry. 64 (5): 619–628. doi:10.1002/(sici)1097-461x(1997)64:5<619::aid-qua13>3.0.co;2-y.
- Baldwin, G. C.; Solem, J. C. (1997c). "Recoilless gamma-ray lasers". Reviews of Modern Physics. 69 (4): 1085–1117. Bibcode:1997RvMP...69.1085B. doi:10.1103/revmodphys.69.1085.
- Dienes, J. K.; Solem, J. C. (1999). "Nonlinear behavior of some hydrostatically stressed isotropic elastomeric foams". Acta Mechanica. 138 (3–4): 155–162. doi:10.1007/bf01291841. S2CID 120320672.
- Solem, J. C. (2000). "Deflection and disruption of asteroids on collision course with Earth". Journal of the British Interplanetary Society. 53: 180–196. Bibcode:2000JBIS...53..180S. Archived from the original on 2016-03-04.
- Solem, J. C. (2002). "Self-assembling micrites based on the Platonic solids". Robotics and Autonomous Systems. 38 (2): 69–92. doi:10.1016/s0921-8890(01)00167-1.
- Colgate, S. A.; Rasmussen, S.; Solem, J. C.; Lackner, K. (2003a). "An astrophysical basis for a universal origin of life". Advances in Complex Systems. 6 (4): 487–505. doi:10.1142/s0219525903001079.
- Beyer, W. A.; Judd, S. L.; Solem, J. C. (2003b). "Pseudo-characteristic functions for convex polyhedra". Real Analysis Exchange. 29 (2): 821–835. doi:10.14321/realanalexch.29.2.0821.
- Hayes, A. C.; Jungman, G.; Solem, J. C.; Bradley, P. A.; Rundberg, R. S. (2006). "Prompt beta spectroscopy as a diagnostic for mix in ignited NIF capsules". Modern Physics Letters A. 21 (13): 1029. arXiv:physics/0408057. Bibcode:2006MPLA...21.1029H. doi:10.1142/s0217732306020317. S2CID 119339212.

== Honors and awards ==
- Fellow of Los Alamos National Laboratory (1996)
- Los Alamos Fellows Award for Dedicated Services as Coordinator of the Fellows (1999-2000)
- Outstanding Mentor Award, Los Alamos National Laboratory (2002)
- Distinguished Performance Award, Los Alamos National Laboratory (1991)
- Sigma Xi (1963)

== Patents held ==
- U.S. Patent No. 4,955,974. September 11, 1990. Rhodes, C. K.; Boyer, K.; Solem, J. C.; Haddad, W. S. "Apparatus for generating x-ray holograms".
- U.S. Patent No. 5,214,581. May 25, 1993. Rhodes, C. K.; Boyer, K.; Solem, J. C.; Haddad, W. S. "Method for object reconstruction from x-ray holograms".

== See also ==
- Project Orion (nuclear propulsion)
