= I Can =

I Can may refer to:

- "I Can" (Blue song), 2011
- "I Can" (Nas song), 2003
- "I Can", a song by Gotthard from Firebirth, 2012
- "I Can", a song by Brian Harvey, 2007
- "I Can", a song by Helloween from Better Than Raw, 1998
- "I Can", a song by Migos, 2017
- "I Can", a song by Raffi, 2010
- "I Can", a song by Skillet from Skillet, 1996

== See also ==
- ICAN (disambiguation)
- I Can Fly (disambiguation)
