= Photon rocket =

Type of rocket

A photon rocket is a rocket that uses thrust from the momentum of emitted photons (radiation pressure by emission) for its propulsion. Photon rockets have been discussed as a propulsion system that could make interstellar flight possible during a human lifetime, which requires the ability to propel spacecraft to speeds at least 10% of the speed of light, v ≈ 0.1c = 30,000 km/s. Traditional photon rockets are proposed to be powered by onboard generators, as in the nuclear photonic rocket. The standard textbook case of such a rocket is the ideal case where all of the fuel is converted to photons which are radiated in the same direction. More realistic treatments take into account the fact that the beam of photons is not perfectly collimated, that not all of the fuel is converted to photons, and so on. A large amount of fuel would be required, and the rocket would be a huge vessel, making such rockets impractical.

== Speed ==
The speed an ideal photon rocket will reach (in the reference frame in which the rocket was at rest initially), in the absence of external forces, depends on the ratio of its initial and final mass:
$$v = c \frac{\left(\frac{m_\text{i}}{m_\text{f}}\right)^2 - 1}{\left(\frac{m_\text{i}}{m_\text{f}}\right)^2 + 1},$$
where $m_\text{i}$ is the initial mass, and $m_\text{f}$ is the final mass.

For example, assuming a spaceship is equipped with a hypothetical pure helium-3 fusion reactor and has an initial mass of 2300 kg, including 1000 kg of helium-3 – meaning that 2.3 kg will be converted to energy (Note: Pure helium-3 fusion reaction is $\ce{^3He + ^3He -> ^4He + 2p+ + 2e-}$. The share of mass converted to energy is $\frac{\text{Mass of}\ \ce{2^3He} - \text{Mass of}\ \ce{^4He,2p+,2e-}}{\text{Mass of}\ \ce{2^3He}} \approx$ $\frac{(2 \cdot 2809.41 - 3728.40 - 2 \cdot 938.27 -2 \cdot 0.51)~\text{MeV}/c^2}{2 \cdot 2809.41~\text{MeV}/c^2} \approx$ $0.002289.$) – and assuming that all this energy is emitted as photons in the direction opposing the direction of travel but the fusion products (helium-4 and hydrogen) are kept on board, the final mass will be (2300 − 2.3) kg = 2297.7 kg, and the spaceship will reach a speed of 1/1000 of the speed of light.

== Derivation ==
The four-momentum of the rocket at rest is denoted as $P_\text{i}$, the rocket after it has burned its fuel as $P_\text{f}$, and the four-momentum of the emitted photons as $P_\text{ph}$. Conservation of four-momentum implies
$$P_\text{ph} = P_\text{i} - P_\text{f}.$$
Squaring both sides (i.e. taking the Lorentz inner product of both sides with themselves) gives
$$P_\text{ph}^2 = P_\text{i}^2 + P_\text{f}^2 - 2P_\text{i} \cdot P_\text{f}.$$
According to the energy–momentum relation $E^2 - (pc)^2 = (mc^2)^2$, the square of the four-momentum equals the square of the mass, and $P_\text{ph}^2 = 0$ because photons have zero mass.

As we start in the rest frame (i.e. the zero-momentum frame) of the rocket, the initial four-momentum of the rocket is
$$P_\text{i} = \begin{pmatrix} \frac{m_\text{i} c^2}{c} \\ 0 \\ 0 \\ 0 \end{pmatrix},$$
while the final four-momentum is
$$P_\text{f} = \begin{pmatrix} \gamma m_\text{f} c \\ \gamma m_\text{f}{v}_\text{f} \\ 0 \\ 0 \end{pmatrix}.$$
Therefore, taking the Minkowski inner product (see four-vector), we get
$$0 = m_\text{i}^2 + m_\text{f}^2 - 2 m_\text{i} m_\text{f}\gamma.$$

We can now solve for the gamma factor, obtaining
$$\gamma = \frac{1}{2} \left(\frac{m_\text{i}}{m_\text{f}} + \frac{m_\text{f}}{m_\text{i}}\right).$$

== Maximum speed limit ==
Standard theory says that the theoretical speed limit of a photon rocket is below the speed of light. Haug has recently suggested a maximum speed limit for an ideal photon rocket that is just below the speed of light. However, his claims have been contested by Tommasini et al., because such velocity is formulated for the relativistic mass and is therefore frame-dependent.

Regardless of the photon generator characteristics, onboard photon rockets powered with nuclear fission and fusion have speed limits from the efficiency of these processes. Here it is assumed that the propulsion system has a single stage. Suppose that the total mass of the photon rocket/spacecraft is M and includes fuels with a mass of αM with α < 1. Assuming the fuel mass to propulsion-system energy conversion efficiency γ and the propulsion-system energy to photon energy conversion efficiency δ ≪ 1, the maximum total photon energy generated for propulsion is
$$E_\text{p} = \alpha\gamma\delta M c^2.$$

If the total photon flux can be directed at 100% efficiency to generate thrust, the total photon thrust is
$$T_\text{p} = \frac{E_\text{p}}{c} = \alpha\gamma\delta M c.$$
The maximum attainable spacecraft velocity V_{max} of the photon propulsion system for V_{max} ≪ c is
$$V_\text{max} = \frac{T_\text{p}}{M} = \alpha\gamma\delta c.$$
For example, the approximate maximum velocities achievable by onboard nuclear-powered photon rockets with assumed parameters are given in the table:

Maximum velocity obtainable by photon rockets with onboard nuclear photon generators with exemplary parameters
| Energy source | α | γ | δ | v_{max}/c | v_{max} (m/s) |
|---|---|---|---|---|---|
| Fission | 0.1 | 10^{−3} | 0.5 | 5 × 10^{−5} | 15 000 |
| Fusion | 0.1 | 4 × 10^{−3} | 0.5 | 2 × 10^{−4} | 60 000 |

The maximum velocity limits by such nuclear powered rockets are less than 0.02% of the light velocity (60 km/s). Therefore, onboard nuclear photon rockets are unsuitable for interstellar missions.

The beamed laser propulsion, such as photonic laser thruster, however, in principle can provide the maximum spacecraft velocity approaching the speed of light, c.

== See also ==
- Beam-powered propulsion
