= Fusion rocket =

Rocket driven by nuclear fusion power

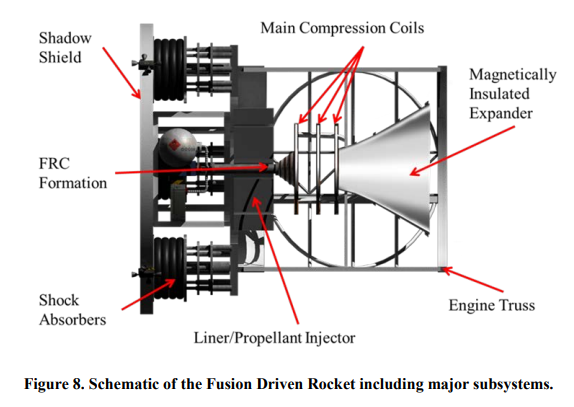
A schematic of a fusion-driven rocket by NASA

A fusion rocket is a theoretical design for a rocket driven by fusion propulsion, which could provide efficient and sustained acceleration in space without the need to carry a large fuel supply. The design requires fusion power technology beyond current capabilities and much larger and more complex rockets.

Fusion nuclear pulse propulsion is one approach to using nuclear fusion energy to provide propulsion.

Fusion's main advantage is its very high specific impulse, while its main disadvantage is the (likely) large mass of the reactor. A fusion rocket may produce less radiation than a fission rocket, reducing the shielding mass needed. The simplest way of building a fusion rocket is to use hydrogen bombs, as proposed in Project Orion, but such a spacecraft would be massive and the Partial Nuclear Test Ban Treaty prohibits the use of such bombs. For that reason bomb-based rockets would likely be limited to operating only in space. An alternate approach uses electrical (e.g. ion) propulsion with electric power generated by fusion instead of direct thrust.

== Electricity generation vs. direct thrust ==
Spacecraft propulsion methods such as ion thrusters require electric power to run but are highly efficient. In some cases their thrust is limited by the amount of power that can be generated (for example, a mass driver). An electric generator running on fusion power could drive such a ship. One disadvantage is that conventional electricity production requires a low-temperature energy sink, which is difficult (i.e. heavy) in a spacecraft. Direct conversion of the kinetic energy of fusion products into electricity mitigates this problem.

One attractive possibility is to direct the fusion exhaust out the back of the rocket to provide thrust without the intermediate production of electricity. This would be easier with some confinement schemes (e.g. magnetic mirrors) than with others (e.g. tokamaks). It is also more attractive for "advanced fuels" (see aneutronic fusion). Helium-3 propulsion would use the fusion of helium-3 atoms as a power source. Helium-3, an isotope of helium with two protons and one neutron, could be fused with deuterium in a reactor. The resulting energy release could expel propellant out the back of the spacecraft. Helium-3 is proposed as a power source for spacecraft mainly because of its lunar abundance. Scientists estimate that one million tons of accessible helium-3 are present on the moon. Only 20% of the power produced by deuterium–tritium fusion could be used this way; while the other 80% is released as neutrons which, because they cannot be directed by magnetic fields or solid walls, would be difficult to direct towards thrust, and may in turn require shielding. Helium-3 is produced via beta decay of tritium, which can be produced from deuterium, lithium, or boron.

Even if a self-sustaining fusion reaction cannot be produced, it might be possible to use fusion to boost the efficiency of another propulsion system, such as a VASIMR engine.

== Confinement alternatives ==
=== Magnetic ===
To sustain a fusion reaction, the plasma must be confined. The most widely studied configuration for terrestrial fusion is the tokamak, a form of magnetic confinement fusion. Currently tokamaks weigh a great deal, so the thrust to weight ratio would seem unacceptable. NASA's Glenn Research Center proposed in 2001 a small aspect ratio spherical torus reactor for its "Discovery II" conceptual vehicle design. "Discovery II" could deliver a crewed 172 metric tons payload to Jupiter in 118 days (or 212 days to Saturn) using 861 metric tons of hydrogen propellant, plus 11 metric tons of Helium-3-Deuterium (D-He3) fusion fuel. The hydrogen is heated by the fusion plasma debris to increase thrust, at a cost of reduced exhaust velocity (348–463 km/s) and hence increased propellant mass.

=== Inertial ===
The main alternative to magnetic confinement is inertial confinement fusion (ICF), such as that proposed by Project Daedalus. A small pellet of fusion fuel (with a diameter of a couple of millimeters) would be ignited by an electron beam or a laser. To produce direct thrust, a magnetic field forms the pusher plate. In principle, the Helium-3-Deuterium reaction or an aneutronic fusion reaction could be used to maximize the energy in charged particles and to minimize radiation, but it is highly questionable whether using these reactions is technically feasible. Both the detailed design studies in the 1970s, the Orion drive and Project Daedalus, used inertial confinement. In the 1980s, Lawrence Livermore National Laboratory and NASA studied an ICF-powered "Vehicle for Interplanetary Transport Applications" (VISTA). The conical VISTA spacecraft could deliver a 100-tonne payload to Mars orbit and return to Earth in 130 days, or to Jupiter orbit and back in 403 days. 41 tonnes of deuterium/tritium (D–T) fusion fuel would be required, plus 4,124 tonnes of hydrogen expellant. The exhaust velocity would be 157 km/s.

The very large necessary mass and the challenge of managing the heat produced in space may make an ICF reactor unworkable in space travel.

=== Magnetized target ===
Magnetized target fusion (MTF) is a relatively new approach that combines the best features of the more widely studied magnetic confinement fusion (i.e. good energy confinement) and inertial confinement fusion (i.e. efficient compression heating and wall free containment of the fusing plasma) approaches. Like the magnetic approach, the fusion fuel is confined at low density by magnetic fields while it is heated into a plasma, but like the inertial confinement approach, fusion is initiated by rapidly squeezing the target to dramatically increase fuel density, and thus temperature. MTF uses "plasma guns" (i.e. electromagnetic acceleration techniques) instead of powerful lasers, leading to low cost and low weight compact reactors. The NASA/MSFC Human Outer Planets Exploration (HOPE) group has investigated a crewed MTF propulsion spacecraft capable of delivering a 164-tonne payload to Jupiter's moon Callisto using 106–165 metric tons of propellant (hydrogen plus either D–T or D–^{3}He fusion fuel) in 249–330 days. This design would thus be considerably smaller and more fuel efficient due to its higher exhaust velocity (700 km/s) than the previously mentioned "Discovery II", "VISTA" concepts.

=== Inertial electrostatic ===
Another popular confinement concept for fusion rockets is inertial electrostatic confinement (IEC), such as in the Farnsworth–Hirsch Fusor or the Polywell variation under development by Energy–Matter Conversion Corporation (EMC2). The University of Illinois has defined a 500-tonne "Fusion Ship II" concept capable of delivering a 100,000 kg crewed payload to Jupiter's moon Europa in 210 days. Fusion Ship II utilizes ion rocket thrusters (343 km/s exhaust velocity) powered by ten D-He3 IEC fusion reactors. The concept would need 300 tonnes of argon propellant for a 1-year round trip to the Jupiter system. Robert Bussard published a series of technical articles discussing its application to spaceflight throughout the 1990s. His work was popularised by an article in the Analog Science Fiction and Fact publication, where Tom Ligon described how the fusor would make for a highly effective fusion rocket.

=== Antimatter ===
A still more speculative concept is antimatter-catalyzed nuclear pulse propulsion, which would use antimatter to catalyze a fission and fusion reaction, allowing much smaller fusion explosions to be created. During the 1990s an abortive design effort was conducted at Penn State University under the name AIMStar. The project would require more antimatter than can currently be produced. In addition, some technical hurdles need to be surpassed before it would be feasible.

== Development projects ==
- Direct Fusion Drive – Conceptual rocket engine
- MSNW Magneto-Inertial Fusion Driven Rocket

== See also ==
- Helium-3
- Nuclear propulsion
- Project Pluto
- Spacecraft propulsion
