= Joint Capability for Airborne Networking =

Joint Capability for Airborne Networking (JCAN) is an airborne networking capability built by Northrop Grumman that builds upon the United States Air Force's Interim Capability for Airborne Networking and integrates with the United States Navy's Automated Digital Network System. The Interim Capability for Airborne Networking is the precursor for the JCAN.
