= 1-Isocyano-5-aminonaphthalene =

Chemical compound

Names
- Preferred IUPAC name 5-Isocyanonaphthalen-1-amine
- Other names 5-Amino-1-isocyanonaphthalene; ICAN

Identifiers
CAS Number	1620067-61-9
3D model (JSmol)	Interactive image
ChemSpider	61012044
PubChem CID	102102046
- InChI: InChI=1S/C11H8N2/c1-13-11-7-3-4-8-9(11)5-2-6-10(8)12/h2-7H,12H2 Key: ZGMMMIZCNKPHTB-UHFFFAOYSA-N
- SMILES: [C-]#[N+]c1cccc2c1cccc(N)2

Properties
Chemical formula	C_{11}H_{8}N_{2}
Molar mass	168.199 g·mol^{−1}
Appearance	Yellow–orange solid (reported)
Solubility in water	Low in water; soluble in organic solvents
- Except where otherwise noted, data are given for materials in their standard state (at 25 °C [77 °F], 100 kPa). Infobox references

1-Isocyano-5-aminonaphthalene (commonly ICAN) is a substituted naphthalene bearing an isocyano (–N≡C) group and an amino (–NH_{2}) group in a 1,5-relationship. The push–pull pairing of an electron donor (amino) and an electron-withdrawing (isocyano) group gives ICAN a pronounced intramolecular charge-transfer (ICT) character, which underlies its strong solvatochromic fluorescence and its use as an environment-sensitive fluorophore. ICAN and several N-alkylated analogues have also been explored as antifungal leads, with reports of low minimum inhibitory concentrations (MICs) against Candida spp. and proof-of-concept efficacy of a dimethylated derivative in a neutropenic mouse model.

== Structure and photophysics ==
The 1,5-arrangement of –NH_{2} and –N≡C on the naphthalene core creates a donor–acceptor system. ICAN exhibits large Stokes shifts and marked solvent-dependent absorption and emission changes; related ICAN isomers (e.g., 1,4-ICAN; 2,6-ICAN) show systematic variations consistent with ICT tuning by the substitution pattern.

== Synthesis ==
ICAN is prepared by the carbylamine (Hofmann) reaction, in which a primary amine is converted to an isocyanide via in situ dichlorocarbene generated from chloroform and base (often with phase-transfer catalysis). For naphthalene systems, treating the appropriate aromatic diamine under carbylamine conditions affords the mono-isocyanide (ICAN) together with minor amounts of the diisocyanide.

By contrast, the related 1,5-diisocyanonaphthalene (DIN) is efficiently obtained by formylation of both amines to a diformamide followed by POCl_{3}-based dehydration; under controlled acidic conditions DIN undergoes partial hydrolysis to give the nonsymmetric 1-formamido-5-isocyanonaphthalene (ICNF).

== Properties and uses ==
=== Fluorescence and solvatochromism ===
ICAN's emission shifts from blue–green in less polar media toward orange–red in polar/protic media; it has been applied as an environment-sensitive probe and as a reference push–pull dye in photophysics.

=== Chemical sensing ===
ICAN-type dyes have been used in complexation/ion-sensing studies (e.g., silver(I) detection) and for background reduction in biolabelling.

=== Antifungal research ===
ICAN, its N-alkyl derivatives, and DIN show in vitro activity against Candida spp.; the dimethylated analogue DIMICAN achieved MIC values as low as 0.04–1.25 μg·mL^{−1} against clinical isolates and improved survival in a neutropenic mouse model of invasive candidiasis (5 mg/kg i.p.).

== Safety ==
ICAN and related solids are often described as having little or no noticeable odour (likely reflecting low volatility); ICAN and its derivatives are reported as odorless. In general, many low-molecular isocyanides are strongly malodorous, although exceptions exist.

== Derivatives ==
Abbrev.	Substituents (1;5)	Photophysical notes (qual.)	Antifungal notes
ICAN	–N≡C; –NH_{2}	Strong ICT; pronounced solvatochromism	Active vs Candida spp. (μg/mL range).
MICAN	–N≡C; –NHCH_{3}	Emission shifted vs ICAN	Active; improved MICs vs ICAN.
DIMICAN	–N≡C; –N(CH_{3})_{2}	Red-shifted emission; strong ICT	Most potent in set; MIC 0.04–1.25 μg/mL; in-vivo efficacy in mice.
DIN	–N≡C; –N≡C	Rigid, lower aqueous solubility	Low MICs in vitro; solubility limits addressed by formulation.
