= I Can Fly =

I Can Fly may refer to:

- I Can Fly, a 1950 children's book by Ruth Krauss
- "I Can Fly", a song by Lana Del Rey from the Big Eyes film soundtrack, 2014
- "I Can Fly," a song by Rachel Fuller from the rock opera The Boy Who Heard Music, 2007
- "I Can Fly," a song by Rainey from the Girls Just Want to Have Fun film soundtrack, 1985

== See also ==
- "I Believe I Can Fly," a song by R. Kelly
