= 1,5-Diisocyanonaphthalene =

Chemical compound

Names
- Preferred IUPAC name 1,5-Diisocyanonaphthalene
- Other names DIN; 1,5-naphthalenediyldiisocyanide

Identifiers
CAS Number	944-69-4
3D model (JSmol)	Interactive image
ChemSpider	32917437
PubChem CID	55274462
- InChI: InChI=1S/C12H6N2/c1-13-11-7-3-6-10-9(11)5-4-8-12(10)14-2/h3-8H Key: HOWLRJRIWHGYOH-UHFFFAOYSA-N
- SMILES: [C-]#[N+]C1=CC=CC2=C1C=CC=C2[N+]#[C-]

Properties
Chemical formula	C_{12}H_{6}N_{2}
Molar mass	178.194 g·mol^{−1}
Appearance	Solid

Hazards
- Occupational safety and health (OHS/OSH)
Main hazards	Laboratory chemical; handle with standard precautions
- Except where otherwise noted, data are given for materials in their standard state (at 25 °C [77 °F], 100 kPa). Infobox references

1,5-Diisocyanonaphthalene (DIN) is an aromatic diisocyanide (isonitrile) in which two –N≡C groups occupy the 1- and 5-positions of the naphthalene ring. The compound is also named 1,5-naphthalenediyldiisocyanide and has the molecular formula C_{12}H_{6}N_{2} and relative molar mass 178.19 g/mol. It has been studied as a photophysical probe and as a lead compound for antifungal research.

== Structure and properties ==
Isocyanides feature the –N≡C functional group (often depicted as –N^{+}≡C^{−} ↔ –N=C:), bonded to the aromatic ring through nitrogen. DIN's two isocyanide substituents make it a rigid, weakly polar π-system. Photophysically, DIN shows limited solvatochromism compared with mono-formamido/mono-isocyano analogues (e.g., ICNF), but it forms notable π-complexes with aromatic solvents that modulate emission, enabling discrimination among aromatics by fluorescence.

== Synthesis ==
1,5-Diisocyanonaphthalene can be obtained by converting 1,5-diaminonaphthalene to the corresponding N,N′-diformamide, followed by dehydration (e.g., with phosphorus oxychloride in the presence of base). Reaction conditions and solvent choice influence outcome for this system.

== Applications ==
Fluorescence/analytical: DIN's emission responds to specific π–π interactions in aromatic solvents, suggesting use in distinguishing aromatic hydrocarbons optically; related hydrolysis-derived ICNF is a strongly solvatochromic dye.

== Antifungal activity ==
In standardized CLSI broth microdilution tests against three Aspergillus fumigatus strains (MYA 3627, ATCC 204305 and Af293), 1,5-diisocyanonaphthalene showed the lowest MIC values among the tested isocyano-naphthalene derivatives, namely 0.6 μg/mL (3.4 μM) for all strains. Practical use may be limited by poor aqueous solubility; a related dimethylamino analogue (DIMICAN) progressed to in-vivo evaluation in a murine aspergillosis model.

== See also ==
- Isocyanide
- Naphthalene
