= Cold shield =

A cold shield is a device to protect an object from unwanted heating by thermal radiation or light. Usually it is a cooled object with low absorption and high reflectivity.

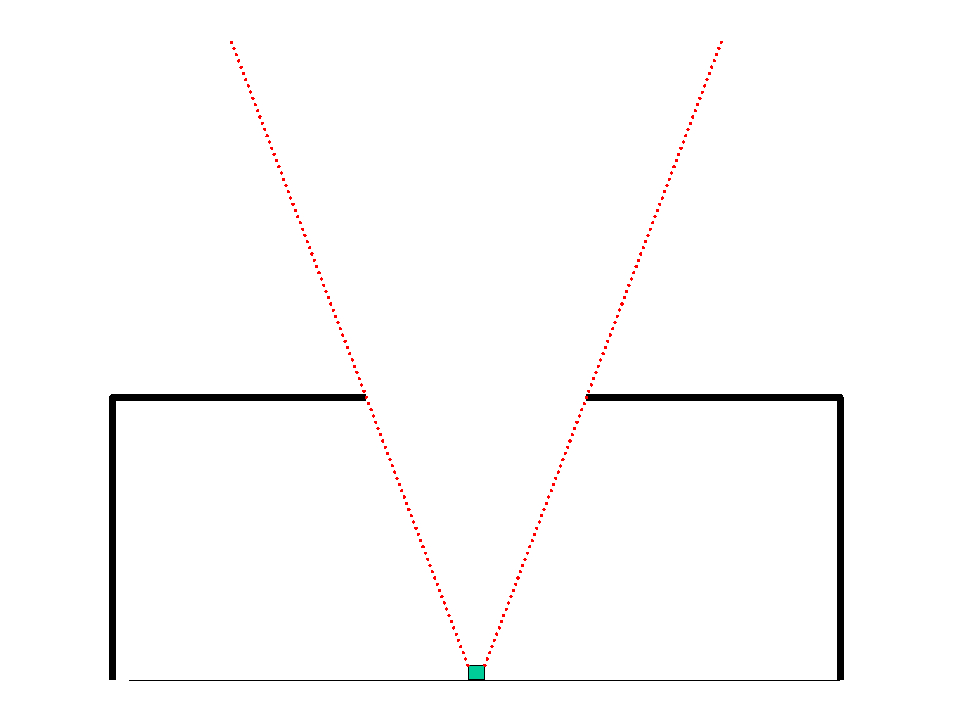
Schematic diagram showing a cross section of a black cold shield reducing the thermal radiation on a point detector

It can be found in molecular beam epitaxy chambers to protect the growth areas from thermal radiation from hot sources. In cryostats, a radiation shield protects a sample from infrared radiation. An infrared detector is protected from thermal background radiation outside its optical field of view. These devices are usually cooled to the same temperature as the detector.

Cold shields are typically used in IR optical devices for military, scientific and industrial applications to protect IR sensors from stray IR radiation (lowering noise figures). Most cold shield applications require near instantaneous cooling, making low mass of the structure very important. Therefore, electroforming is the preferred method of fabricating cold shields.

== See also ==
- Space sunshade
