= Ford Nucleon =

1957 concept for a nuclear-powered car

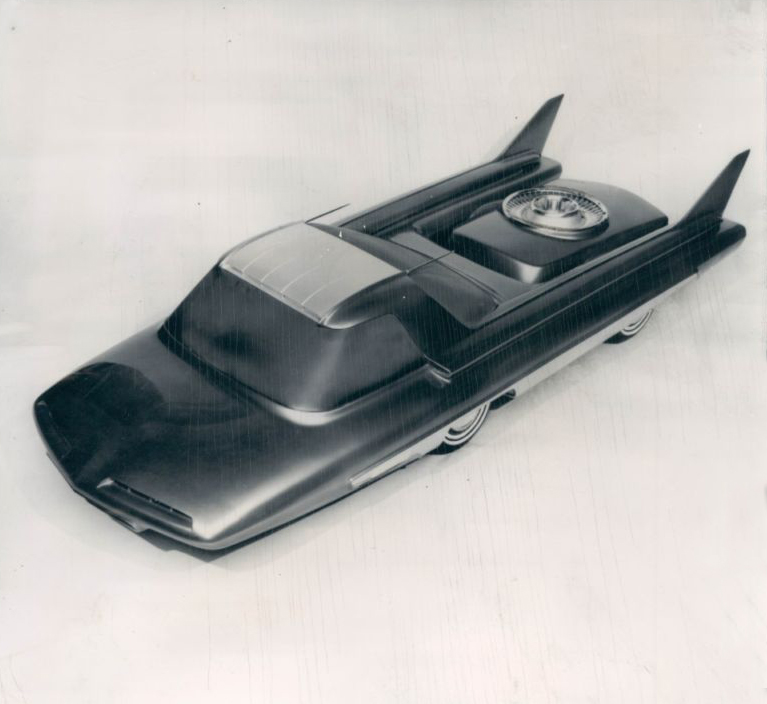
The Ford Nucleon concept car

The Ford Nucleon is a concept car developed by Ford in 1957, designed as a future nuclear-powered car—one of a handful of such designs during the 1950s and 1960s. The concept was only demonstrated as a scale model. The design did not include an internal combustion engine; rather, the vehicle was to be powered by a small nuclear reactor at its rear, based on the assumption that nuclear reactors would eventually become small enough to make this possible. The car was to use a steam engine powered by uranium fission, similar to those found in nuclear submarines.

The Nucleon was not a serious design, but rather a vision of the future when such a small reactor with small and light radiation shielding might become possible. It was described in June 1957 as "an advanced notion of the automotive future" and as a "futuristic fancy". Ford stated:

"The Nucleon was styled on the assumption that the present bulkiness and weight of nuclear reactors and attendant shielding will some day be reduced. It seems reasonable to suppose that engineers eventually will discover a way to make this weight reduction possible."

— George W. Walker, Vice President for Styling at Ford

This supposition has not come to pass, and modern fission reactors with enough power to propel a vehicle still require roughly 5 feet of radiation shielding (e.g. concrete, water, and/or tungsten) to prevent the operator from absorbing hazardous amounts of radiation dose.

The mock-up of the car can be viewed at the Henry Ford Museum in Dearborn, Michigan.

== Design concept ==
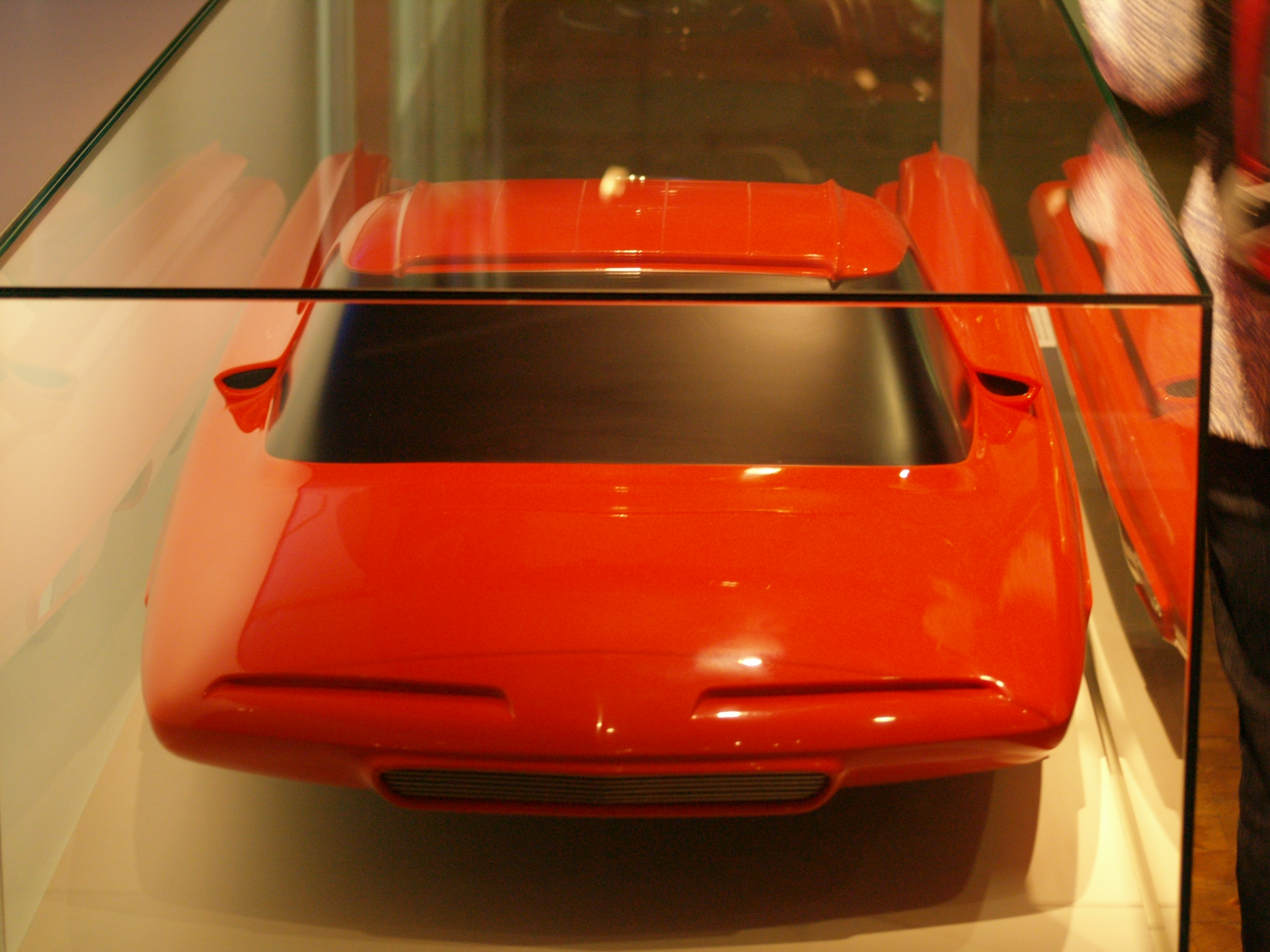
Nucleon at the Deutsches Technikmuseum Berlin

At the time of the concept's unveiling, nuclear technology was relatively new, and it was believed that nuclear fission technology could be made compact and affordable, so that nuclear fuel would become the primary energy source in the U.S., and gasoline would become obsolete. Ford envisioned a future where gas stations would be replaced with full service recharging stations, and that the vehicle would get 5,000 miles (8,000 km) before the reactor would have to be exchanged for a new one. These would be scaled-down versions of the nuclear reactors that military submarines used at the time, utilizing uranium as the fissile material. Because the entire reactor would be replaced, Ford hypothesized that the owner would have multiple choices for reactors, such as a fuel-efficient model or a high-performance model, at each reactor change. Ultimately, the reactor would use heat to convert water into steam and the power train would be steam-driven.

== In popular culture ==
The Nucleon is the inspiration for nuclear cars in the Fallout video game franchise. For example, in-game billboards describe the fictional Chryslus Corvega Atomic V8 as having an "Atomic V8" engine. The game's depiction is purely satirical, as the cars explode into an implausible mushroom cloud and release radiation when shot.

== See also ==
- Ford Seattle-ite XXI
- Studebaker Packard Astral
