= Interim Capability for Airborne Networking =

Interim Capability for Airborne Networking (ICAN) is a capability of the United States Air Force that enables secure airborne communication built by Northrop Grumman. ICAN was the precursor of the Joint Capability for Airborne Networking.
