= Icahn =

Icahn may refer to:

- Icahn School of Medicine at Mount Sinai
- Icahn Stadium
- Icahn Enterprises
- Carl Icahn (born 1936), American entrepreneur
  - Brett Icahn (born 1979), American businessman, son of Carl Icahn
