= ICAN: Infant, Child, & Adolescent Nutrition =

- Discipline: Pediatric nutrition
- Language: English
- Edited by: Linda Heller

Publication details
- History: 2009-2015
- Publisher: SAGE Publications
- Frequency: Bimonthly

Standard abbreviations
- ISO 4: Infant Child Adolesc. Nutr.

Indexing
- ISSN: 1941-4064 (print); 1941-4072 (web)
- OCLC no.: 192020833

Links
- Journal homepage; Online access; Online archive

ICAN: Infant, Child, & Adolescent Nutrition is a defunct peer-reviewed medical journal that covers the field of pediatric nutrition. The editor-in-chief was Linda Heller. It was published from 2009 to 2015 by SAGE Publications.

== Abstracting and indexing ==
ICAN: Infant, Child, & Adolescent Nutrition is abstracted and indexed in CABI and Scopus.
