= ICAN-II =

Proposed crewed interplanetary spacecraft

ICAN-II was a proposed crewed interplanetary spacecraft that used the antimatter-catalyzed micro-fission (ACMF) engine as its main form of propulsion.

== History ==
The spacecraft was designed at Penn State University in the 1990s as a way to accomplish a crewed mission to Mars. The proposed ACMF engine would require only 140 nanograms of antiprotons in conjunction with traditional fissionable fuel sources to allow a one-way transit time to Mars of 30 days. This is a considerable improvement over many other forms of propulsion that can be used for interplanetary missions, due to the high thrust-to-weight ratio and specific impulse of nuclear fuels. Some downsides to the design include the radiation hazards inherent to nuclear pulse propulsion, as well as the limited availability of the antiprotons used to initialize the nuclear fission reaction. Even the small amount required by the ACMF engine is equal to the total antimatter production at the facilities CERN and Fermilab over many years, although these create antimatter only as a byproduct of physics experiments, not as a goal.

ICAN-II is similar to the Project Orion design put forth by Stanislaw Ulam in the late 1950s. The Orion was intended to be used to send humans to Mars and Venus by 1968. The ICAN-II also, in a sense, utilizes nuclear "bombs" for thrust. However, instead of regular fission bombs like the Orion would utilize, ICAN-II uses what are, essentially, many tiny hydrogen bombs, set off by a stream of anti-protons. Ecological concerns would probably require that ICAN-II be assembled in space.

The radiation from ICAN-II's ACMF engine would be intercepted by a 4-meter radius silicon carbide shell. Additionally, 1.2 meters of lithium hydride will shield the fuel rings from high-energy neutrons that are ejected from the nuclear explosions, and 2.2 meters of shielding will protect the crew modules. The spacecraft would have a total mass of 625 metric tons, with 82 additional metric tons available for payload. This is more than sufficient to carry a Mars lander and exploration vehicles.

== See also ==
- AIMStar
- Nuclear pulse propulsion
