= Nuclear photonic rocket =

Rocket engine that uses photons to propel a spacecraft

In a traditional nuclear photonic rocket, an onboard nuclear reactor would generate such high temperatures that the blackbody radiation from the reactor would provide significant thrust. The disadvantage is that it takes a large amount of power to generate a small amount of thrust this way, so acceleration is very low. The photon radiators would most likely be constructed using graphite or tungsten. Photonic rockets are technologically feasible, but rather impractical with current technology based on an onboard nuclear power source.

== Energy requirements and comparisons ==
The power per thrust required for a perfectly collimated output beam is 300 MW/N (half this if it can be reflected off the craft); very high energy density power sources would be required to provide reasonable thrust without unreasonable weight. The specific impulse of a photonic rocket is harder to define, since the output has no (rest) mass and is not expended fuel; if we take the momentum per inertia of the photons, the specific impulse is just c, which is impressive. However, considering the mass of the source of the photons, e.g., atoms undergoing nuclear fission, brings the specific impulse down to 300 km/s (c/1000) or less; considering the infrastructure for a reactor (some of which also scales with the amount of fuel) reduces the value further. Finally, any energy loss not through radiation that is redirected precisely to aft but is instead conducted away by engine supports, radiated in some other direction, or lost via neutrinos or so will further degrade the efficiency. If we were to set 80% of the mass of the photon rocket = fissionable fuel, and recognizing that nuclear fission converts about 0.10% of the mass into energy: then if the photon rocket masses 300,000 kg then 240,000 kg of that is atomic fuel. Therefore, the fissioning of all of the fuel will result in the loss of just 240 kg of mass. Then 300,000/299,760 kg = an m_{i}/m_{f} of 1.0008. Using the rocket equation, we find v_{f} = ln 1.0008 × c where c = 299,792,458 m/s. v_{f} then may be 239,930 m/s which is about 240 km/s. The nuclear fission powered photon rocket may accelerate at a maximum of perhaps 1/10,000 m/s² (0.1 mm/s²) which is 10^{−5}g. The velocity change would be at the rate of 3,000 m/s per year of thrusting by the photon rocket.

If a photon rocket begins its journey in low Earth orbit, then one year of thrusting may be required to achieve an Earth escape velocity of 11.2 km/s if the vehicle is already in orbit at a velocity of 9,100 m/s. Upon escaping the Earth's gravitational field the rocket will have a heliocentric velocity of 30 km/s in interplanetary space. Eighty years of steady photonic thrusting would be then required to obtain a final velocity of 240 km/s in this hypothetical case.

It is possible to obtain even higher specific impulse; that of some other photonic propulsion devices (e.g., solar sails) is effectively infinite because no carried fuel is required. Alternatively, such devices as ion thrusters, while having a notably lower specific impulse, give a much better thrust-to-power ratio; for photons, that ratio is $1/c$, whereas for slow particles (that is, nonrelativistic; even the output from typical ion thrusters counts) the ratio is $2/v$, which is much larger (since $v\ll c$). (This is in a sense an unfair comparison, since the photons must be created and other particles are merely accelerated, but nonetheless the impulses per carried mass and per applied energy—the practical quantities—are as given.) The photonic rocket is thus wasteful when power and not mass is at a premium, or when enough mass can be saved through the use of a weaker power source that reaction mass can be included without penalty.

A laser could be used as a photon rocket engine, and would solve the reflection/collimation problem, but lasers are absolutely less efficient at converting energy into light than blackbody radiation is—though one should also note the benefits of lasers vs blackbody source, including unidirectional controllable beam and the mass and durability of the radiation source. The limitations posed by the rocket equation can be overcome, as long as the reaction mass is not carried by the spacecraft. In the Beamed Laser Propulsion (BLP) concept, the photons are beamed from the photon source to the spacecraft as coherent light. Robert L. Forward pioneered interstellar propulsion concepts including photon propulsion and antimatter rocket propulsion. However, BLP is limited because of the extremely low thrust generation efficiency of photon reflection. One of the best ways to overcome the inherent inefficiency in producing thrust of the photon thruster by amplifying the momentum transfer of photons by recycling photons between two high reflectance mirrors.

== Power sources ==
Feasible current, or near-term fission reactor designs can generate up to 2.2 kW per kilogram of reactor mass. Without any payload, such a reactor could drive a photon rocket at nearly 10^{−5} m/s² (10^{−6}g; see g-force). This could perhaps provide interplanetary spaceflight capability from Earth orbit. Nuclear fusion reactors could also be used, perhaps providing somewhat higher power.

A design proposed in the 1950s by Eugen Sänger used positron-electron annihilation to produce gamma rays. Sänger was unable to solve the problem of how to reflect, and collimate the gamma rays created by positron-electron annihilation; however, by shielding the reactions (or other annihilations) and absorbing their energy, a similar blackbody propulsion system could be created. An antimatter-matter powered photon rocket would (disregarding the shielding) obtain the maximum c specific impulse; for this reason, an antimatter-matter annihilation powered photon rocket could potentially be used for interstellar spaceflight.

Theoretically, other designs such as spacecraft using a Kugelblitz micro black hole could also be used for interstellar travel given the efficiency of black holes in converting matter into energy.

== See also ==
- Photon rocket
- Spacecraft propulsion
- Radioisotope rocket
