= Magnetic nozzle =

Space propulsion system using plasma

A magnetic nozzle is a convergent-divergent magnetic field that guides, expands and accelerates a plasma jet into vacuum for the purpose of space propulsion. The magnetic field in a magnetic nozzle plays a similar role to the convergent-divergent solid walls in a de Laval nozzle, wherein a hot neutral gas is expanded first subsonically and then supersonically to increase thrust. Like a de Laval nozzle, a magnetic nozzle converts the internal energy of the plasma into directed kinetic energy, but the operation is based on the interaction of the applied magnetic field with the electric charges in the plasma, rather than on pressure forces acting on solid walls. The main advantage of a magnetic nozzle over a solid one is that it can operate contactlessly, i.e. avoiding the material contact with the hot plasma, which would lead to system inefficiencies and reduced lifetime of the nozzle. Additional advantages include the capability of modifying the strength and geometry of the applied magnetic field in-flight, allowing the nozzle to adapt to different propulsive requirements and space missions. Magnetic nozzles are the fundamental acceleration stage of several next-generation plasma thrusters currently under development, such as the helicon plasma thruster, the electron-cyclotron resonance plasma thruster, the VASIMR, and the applied-field magnetoplasmadynamic thruster. Magnetic nozzles also find another field of application in advanced plasma manufacturing processes, and their physics are related to those of several magnetic confinement plasma fusion devices.

== Basic operation of a magnetic nozzle ==
The expansion of a plasma in a magnetic nozzle is inherently more complex than the expansion of a gas in a solid nozzle, and is the result of several intertwined phenomena, which ultimately rely on the large mass difference between electrons and ions and the electric and magnetic interactions between them and the applied field.

If the strength of the applied magnetic field is sufficient, it magnetizes the light electrons in the plasma, which therefore describe a helicoidal motion about the magnetic lines. In practice, this is achieved with magnetic fields in the range of a few hundred Gauss. The guiding center of each electron is forced to travel along one magnetic tube. This magnetic confinement prevents the uncontrolled expansion of the electrons in the radial direction and guides them axially downstream. The heavier ions are typically unmagnetized or only partially magnetized, but are forced to expand with the electrons thanks to the electric field that is set up in the plasma to maintain quasineutrality. As a result of the ensuing electric field, the ions are accelerated downstream, while all electrons except the more energetic ones are confined upstream. In this way, the electric field helps convert the electron internal energy into directed ion kinetic energy.

In steady-state operation, the exhausted plasma jet is globally current-free, i.e., the total ion current and electron current at each section are equal. This condition prevents the continuous electrical charging of the spacecraft on which the magnetic nozzle is mounted, which would result if the amount of ions and electrons emitted per unit time differ.

The electron pressure being confined by the magnetic field gives rise to a diamagnetic drift, which is proportional to the pressure of electrons and inversely proportional to the magnetic field strength. Together with the $E\times B$ drift, the diamagnetic drift is responsible of the formation of an azimuthal electric current $j_\theta$ in the plasma domain. This azimuthal electric current generates an induced magnetic field which opposes the applied one, generating a repulsive magnetic force $\propto j_\theta B$ that pushes the plasma downstream. The reaction to this force is felt on the magnetic generator of the magnetic nozzle and is called magnetic thrust. This is the main thrust generation mechanism in a magnetic nozzle.

== Plasma detachment ==
The closed nature of the magnetic lines means that unless the plasma separates from the guiding magnetic field downstream, it will turn around along the field lines back to the thruster. This would defeat the propulsive purpose of the magnetic nozzle, as the returning plasma would cancel thrust and could endanger the integrity of the spacecraft and the plasma thruster. A plasma detachment mechanism is therefore necessary for the correct operation of the magnetic nozzle.

As the plasma expands in the divergent side of the magnetic nozzle, ions are gradually accelerated to hypersonic velocities thanks to the role of the internal electric field in the plasma. Eventually, the unmagnetized, massive ions are fast enough that the weak electric and magnetic forces in the downstream region become insufficient to deflect the ion trajectories except for extremely high magnetic strengths. As a natural consequence, plasma detachment starts to take place and, the amount of plasma mass flow rate that is actually deflected along the magnetic field and turns back to maintain quasineutral conditions in the plasma is negligible. In consequence, the magnetic nozzle is capable of delivering detached plasma jets usable for propulsion.

The separation of ions due to their inertia leads to the formation of local longitudinal electric currents, that do not violate however the global current-free condition in the jet. The influence of the plasma-induced magnetic field, which can deform the magnetic nozzle downstream, and the formation of non-neutral regions, can further reduce the turn-back plasma losses.

== Propulsive performance ==
The performance of a magnetic nozzle, in terms of its specific impulse, generated thrust and overall efficiency depends on the plasma thruster to which it is connected. The magnetic nozzle should be regarded as a thrust augmentation device, whose role is to convert plasma thermal energy into directed kinetic energy as discussed above. Therefore, thrust and specific impulse are strongly dependent on the electron temperature of the plasma inside the plasma source. A high electron temperature (i.e., a hot plasma) is required to have an effective plasma thruster.

The efficiency of the magnetic nozzle has to be discussed in terms of divergence or radial losses. As a byproduct of the expansion in the divergent magnetic nozzle, part of the kinetic energy of ions is directed in the radial and azimuthal directions. This energy is useless for thrust generation, and therefore accounts as losses. An efficient magnetic nozzle is sufficiently long to minimize the amount of energy wasted in the radial and azimuthal directions. Additionally, an excessively weak magnetic field would fail to confine radially and guide axially the plasma, incurring in large radial losses.

Other figures of merit of the system are the electric power, mass and volume of the required magnetic field generator (magnetic coils and/or permanent magnets). A low electric power consumption, mass and volume are desirable for space propulsion applications.
