= AIMStar =

Cancelled project of a space probe to reach 10,000 AU from the Sun

AIMStar (with AIM standing for Antimatter-Initiated Microfusion) was a proposed antimatter-catalyzed nuclear pulse propulsion craft that uses clouds of antiprotons to initiate small-scale fusion reaction within fuel pellets. A magnetic nozzle derives motive force from the resulting explosions.

== History ==
The design was studied during the 1990s by Penn State University. The craft was designed to reach a distance on the order of 10,000 AU from the Sun, with a travel time of 50 years, and a coasting velocity of approximately 960 km/s after the boost phase (roughly 1/300th of the speed of light). The probe would be able to study the interstellar medium as well as reach Alpha Centauri. It would use deuterium and helium-3 as fuel, ignited by a small-scale annihlation reaction between antiprotons and an actinide metal (such as uranium-238), for a specific impulse envisioned to be as high as 61 000 s. The AIM engine would be contained in a dedicated "booster", which would separate from the payload after fuel depletion. The envisioned scientific instruments included a magnetometer, a near-infrared spectrometer, a ion-mass spectrometer, and a optical imager, communicating with the DSN through an 8m diameter parabolic antenna and powered by a 780W AMTEC Radioisotope thermoelectric generator.

The project would require more antimatter than could be produced at time of publishing. In addition, numerous technical issues (like collection and storage of antimatter) would need to be solved before the project was feasible.

== See also ==
- ICAN-II - A similar concept that uses less antimatter but more fission propellant
- Nuclear pulse propulsion
