= Antimatter-catalyzed nuclear pulse propulsion =

Proposed nuclear pulse propulsion through antimatter-catalyzed nuclear chain reactions

Antimatter-catalyzed nuclear pulse propulsion, antiproton-catalyzed nuclear pulse propulsion, ACMF: Antiproton-Catalyzed Microfission-Fusion and AIM: Antimatter Influenced Microfission-fusion are variants of nuclear pulse propulsion based upon the injection of antimatter into a mass of nuclear fuel to initiate or enhance a nuclear chain reaction for propulsion especially when the fuel is subcritical.

== Description ==
Typical nuclear pulse propulsion has the downside that the minimal size of the engine is defined by the minimal size of the nuclear bombs used to create thrust, which is a function of the amount of critical mass required to initiate the reaction. A conventional thermonuclear bomb design consists of two parts: the primary, which is almost always based on plutonium, and a secondary using fusion fuel, which is normally deuterium in the form of lithium deuteride, and tritium (which is created during the reaction as lithium is transmuted to tritium). There is a minimal size for the primary (about 10 kilograms for plutonium-239) to achieve critical mass. More powerful devices scale up in size primarily through the addition of fusion fuel for the secondary. Of the two, the fusion fuel is much less expensive and gives off far fewer radioactive products, so from a cost and efficiency standpoint, larger bombs are much more efficient. However, using such large bombs for spacecraft propulsion demands much larger structures able to handle the stress. There is a tradeoff between the two demands.

By injecting a small amount of antimatter into a subcritical mass of fuel (typically plutonium or uranium) fission of the fuel can be forced. An anti-proton has a negative electric charge, just like an electron, and can be captured in a similar way by a positively charged atomic nucleus. The initial configuration, however, is not stable and radiates energy as gamma rays. As a consequence, the anti-proton moves closer and closer to the nucleus until their quarks can interact, at which point the anti-proton and a proton are both annihilated. This reaction releases a tremendous amount of energy, of which some is released as gamma rays and some is transferred as kinetic energy to the nucleus, causing it to split (the fission reaction). The resulting shower of neutrons can cause the surrounding fuel to undergo rapid fission or even nuclear fusion.

The lower limit of the device size is determined by anti-proton handling issues and fission reaction requirements, such as the structure used to contain and direct the blast. As such, unlike either the Project Orion-type propulsion system, which requires large numbers of nuclear explosive charges, or the various antimatter drives, which require impossibly expensive amounts of antimatter, antimatter-catalyzed nuclear pulse propulsion has intrinsic advantages.

A conceptual design of an antimatter-catalyzed thermonuclear explosive physics package is one in which the primary mass of plutonium usually necessary for the ignition in a conventional Teller–Ulam thermonuclear explosion, is replaced by one microgram of antihydrogen. In this theoretical design, the antimatter is helium-cooled and magnetically levitated in the center of the device, in the form of a pellet a tenth of a millimeter in diameter, a position analogous to the primary fission core in the layer cake/Sloika design. As the antimatter must remain away from ordinary matter until the desired moment of the explosion, the central pellet must be isolated from the surrounding hollow sphere of 100 grams of thermonuclear fuel. During and after the implosive compression by the high-explosive lenses, the fusion fuel comes into contact with the antihydrogen. Annihilation reactions, which would start soon after the Penning trap is destroyed, is to provide the energy to begin the nuclear fusion in the thermonuclear fuel. If the chosen degree of compression is high, a device with increased explosive/propulsive effects is obtained, and if it is low, that is, the fuel is not at high density, a considerable number of neutrons will escape the device, and a neutron bomb forms. In both cases the electromagnetic pulse effect and the radioactive fallout are substantially lower than that of a conventional fission or Teller–Ulam device of the same yield, approximately 1 kt.

== Amount needed for thermonuclear device ==
The number of antiprotons required to catalyse (enhance) vs initiate (trigger) are not the same. To trigger a thermonuclear explosion the amount was calculated in 2005 to be 10^{18}, which means 1.67 micrograms of antihydrogen.

Tuning of the performance of a space vehicle is also possible. Rocket efficiency is strongly related to the mass of the working mass used, which in this case is the nuclear fuel. The energy released by a given mass of fusion fuel is several times larger than that released by the same mass of a fission fuel. For missions requiring short periods of high thrust, such as crewed interplanetary missions, pure microfission might be preferred because it reduces the number of fuel elements needed. For missions with longer periods of higher efficiency but with lower thrust, such as outer-planet probes, a combination of microfission and fusion might be preferred because it would reduce the total fuel mass.

== Research ==
The concept was invented at Pennsylvania State University before 1992. Since then, several groups have studied antimatter-catalyzed micro fission/fusion engines in the lab. Work has been performed at Lawrence Livermore National Laboratory on antiproton-initiated fusion as early as 2004. In contrast to the large mass, complexity and recirculating power of conventional drivers for inertial confinement fusion (ICF), antiproton annihilation offers a specific energy of 90 MJ/μg and thus a unique form of energy packaging and delivery. In principle, antiproton drivers could provide a profound reduction in system mass for advanced space propulsion by ICF.

Antiproton-driven ICF is a speculative concept, and the handling of antiprotons and their required injection precision—temporally and spatially—will present significant technical challenges. The storage and manipulation of low-energy antiprotons, particularly in the form of antihydrogen, is a science in its infancy, and a large scale-up of antiproton production over present supply methods would be required to embark on a serious R&D programme for such applications.

A record for antimatter storage of just over 1000 seconds, performed in the CERN facility, during 2011, was at the time a monumental leap from the millisecond timescales that previously were achievable. More recently, antiprotons were stored for 614 days between 2023 and 2025, also at CERN.

Total world-wide production of anti-protons in a period of a year is in the range of nanograms. The anti-matter trap (Mark 1 version) at Penn State University has the capacity for the storage of 10 billion for a period of approximately 168 hours. Project Icarus has given the estimated potential cost of production of 1 milligram of anti-proton as $100 billion.

== Criticism ==
It is technically an antiproton 'enhanced' -rather than "'catalyzed'"- reaction because the antimatter used to initiate each reaction is consumed. Although anti-particles may be produced again in-situ and anihilated instantly during the process, if antimatter were indeed present as a catalyst the original anti-particles would remain unchanged by the process and their continued existence would influence further reactions. Nevertheless, the technically sloppy but popular nomenclature persists.

== See also ==
- AIMStar
- Antimatter rocket
- Antimatter weapon
- ICAN-II
- Nuclear pulse propulsion
