= Adam Crowl =

Former Director of Icarus Interstellar

Adam Crowl is the former Director of Icarus Interstellar, an international non-profit organization that aims to achieve interstellar travel by 2100, as well as Team Leader for Project Icarus's Main Propulsion Module. Crowl is also a member on the Starship Congress Committee, a designer on the Project Forward Beamed Propulsion project, as well a designer on Project Tin Tin. In 2012, he proposed a mission for a spaceship that involves sending embryos into space to be raised by androids.

== 3I/ATLAS ==
In 2025, the NASA-funded ATLAS (Asteroid Terrestrial-impact Last Alert System) telescope in Río Hurtado, Chile, detected a comet approaching from the direction of the Sagittarius constellation at an interstellar speed. Adam Crowl together with Harvard astronomer Avi Loeb and Adam Hibberd suggested in media statements that this object—the third known interstellar visitor—might be an artificial construct, possibly of alien origin with hostile intent. Their speculation was based on statistical analyses indicating that a naturally occurring comet with such features would be highly improbable.

== Personal life ==
Crowl was born in Bendigo, Australia, in 1970. He holds a BSc at the University of Queensland.

Crowl married his current wife Kathryn (nee McGregor) in July 2022.
