= High Earth orbit =

Geocentric orbit with an altitude entirely above that of a geosynchronous orbit

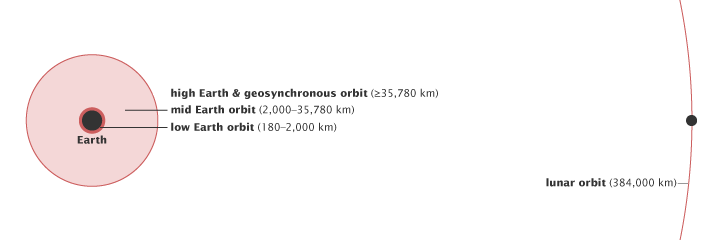
Space of high Earth orbits (HEO), between medium Earth orbits (MEO) and the orbit of the Moon.

A high Earth orbit is a geocentric orbit with an apogee farther than that of the geosynchronous orbit, which is 35,786 km (22,236 mi) away from Earth. In this article, the non-standard abbreviation of HEO is used for high Earth orbit.

The development of HEO technology has had a significant impact on space exploration and has paved the way for future missions to deep space. The ability to place satellites in HEO has allowed scientists to make groundbreaking discoveries in astronomy and Earth science, while also enabling global communication and navigation systems.

The Moon's Hill sphere is entered at a distance to the Moon of 60,000 km (37,000 mi), lunar orbits until a distance of 690 km (430 mi) are unstable due to Earth's gravitational reach. Near-rectilinear halo orbits around the Moon are within these distances to the Moon, occupying cislunar space. Earth's hill sphere extends to a distance of 1,471,400 km (914,300 mi), encompassing halo orbits, orbits around the Sun-Earth Lagrange points, with orbits increasingly being heliocentric, co-orbiting with Earth the Sun before orbits go deeper into interplanetary space.

== Common types of high Earth orbits ==
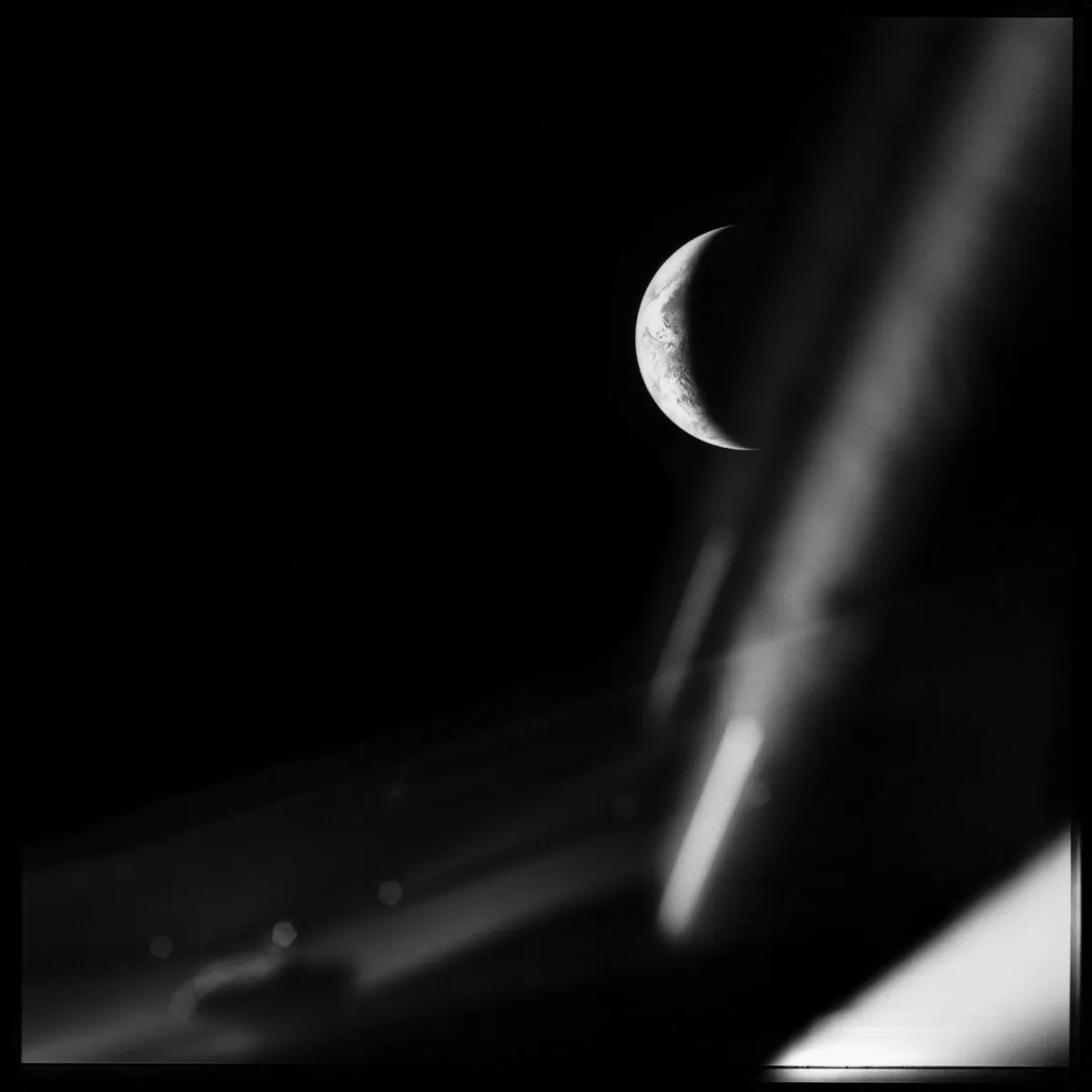
A view of a crescent Earth taken from inside Apollo 13's Lunar Module on 17 April 1970.

| Orbit | Name |
|---|---|
| GEO | Geostationary orbit |
| GSO | Geosynchronous orbit |
| GTO | Geostationary transfer orbit |
| HEO | Highly elliptical orbit |
| NRHO | Near-rectilinear halo orbit |

Satellites in High Earth orbits are primarily used for communication, navigation, scientific research, and military applications. One of the main benefits of HEO is that it provides a nearly unobstructed view of the Earth and deep space. This makes it an ideal location for astronomical observations and Earth monitoring. In addition, satellites in HEO can provide a continuous coverage of the Earth's surface, making it very useful for communication and navigation purposes. A variety of satellites, such as TESS, have been placed in HEO.

There are four main reasons that most satellite are placed in lower orbits. First, a HEO can take a month or more per orbit. This is because HEOs are very large orbits and move at only 3000 m/s (11,000 km/h, 7000 mph). Meanwhile, a LEO (low Earth orbit) can take less than 90 minutes. So, for satellites that need to orbit quickly, HEO is not a good fit. Second, HEOs take far more energy to place a satellite into than LEOs. To place a satellite into HEO takes nearly as much energy as to place it into a heliocentric orbit. For example, an expended Falcon 9 can carry 22,500 kg (50,000 lbs) to LEO. However, it can only carry around 4500 kg (10,000 lbs) to HEO. This means that it costs 5 times more to place a payload in HEO versus placing it in LEO. Third, HEOs are extremely far from Earth. This means that there is a constant communication delay when sending signals to and from the satellite. This is actually because the signals can only travel at the speed of light. This means that it can take around 0.1 to 4.5 seconds in delay time each way. This makes it useless for internet, and hard to use for other things as well. The fourth reason is radiation. HEO is outside of the magnetic field of Earth. This means that there is far more radiation in HEO. As a result, spacecraft in HEO require specialized equipment and shielding to protect them from radiation. As a result, only satellites that require the unique characteristics of HEO use this orbit.

A special case of a high Earth orbit is the highly elliptical orbit where altitude at perigee may reach as low as 2,000 km (1,200 mi).

== Examples of satellites in high Earth orbit ==
| Satellite | NSSDC id. | Launch date | Perigee | Apogee | Period | Inclination |
|---|---|---|---|---|---|---|
| Vela 1A | 1963-039A | 1963-10-17 | 101,925 km | 116,528 km | 108 hr 39 min | 37.8° |
| Interstellar Boundary Explorer (IBEX) | 2008-051A | 2008-10-19 | 61,941 km | 290,906 km | 216 hr 3 min | 16.9° |
| Transiting Exoplanet Survey Satellite (TESS) | 2018-038A | 2018-04-18 | 108,000 km | 375,000 km | 328 hr 48 min | 37.00° |
| Chandrayaan-3 propulsion module | 2023-098B | 2023-07-14 | 115,000 km | 154,000 km | ~312 hr | 27° |

== See also ==
- List of orbits
