= Project Dragonfly (space study) =

Feasibility study of a small laser-propelled interstellar probe

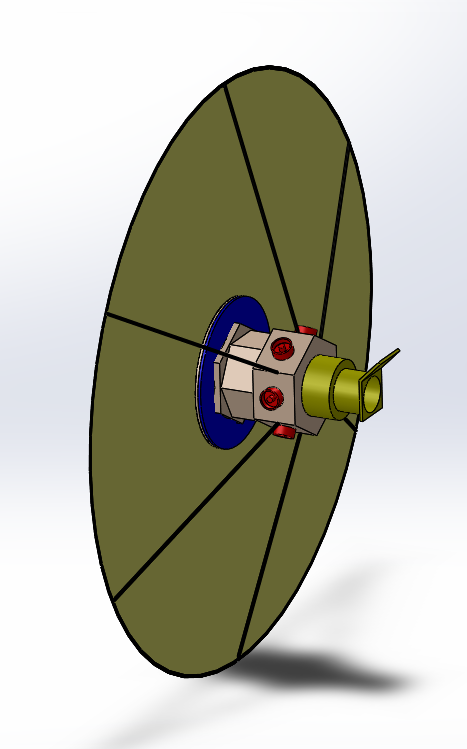
Rendering of the Dragonfly-Probe: This concept won the Project Dragonfly Design Competition. Its sail is not depicted to scale, it would be kilometres across.

Project Dragonfly is the first conceptual design study that assesses the feasibility of a laser-propelled interstellar probe, conducted by the Initiative for Interstellar Studies. Contrary to past unmanned interstellar mission studies such as Project Daedalus and Project Icarus, the focus is particularly on a small spacecraft. The project was founded in 2013 by the Initiative for Interstellar Studies (i4is).

A subsequent design competition was launched in 2014. The objective was to design a spacecraft that is capable of reaching Alpha Centauri within 100 years using existing or near-term technologies and a beam power below 100 GW. Four teams presented their designs at the final workshop at the British Interplanetary Society in London in July 2015. The teams consisted of students from Cairo University, Cranfield University, the Skolkovo Institute of Science and Technology, Texas A and M University, Technical University of Munich, and University of California, Santa Barbara. The team of the WARR of the Technical University of Munich won the competition.

The design of the University of California, Santa Barbara has subsequently evolved into the design for Breakthrough Starshot of the Breakthrough Initiatives. Results of the competition have subsequently been published in peer-reviewed journals. The competition has been accompanied by a Kickstarter campaign that was supported by space artists such as David A. Hardy.

== See also ==
- Interstellar travel
- Fermi Explorer
- Project Daedalus
- Project Icarus
- Spacecraft propulsion
- Beam-powered propulsion
- Laser propulsion
