= Project Dragonfly =

Project Dragonfly may refer to

- Project Dragonfly (space study) - the first conceptual design study that assesses the feasibility of a laser-propelled interstellar probe.
- Google's development of the Dragonfly search engine intended for use in the People's Republic of China
