= Alpha Centauri Bb =

Disproven exoplanet orbiting Alpha Centauri B

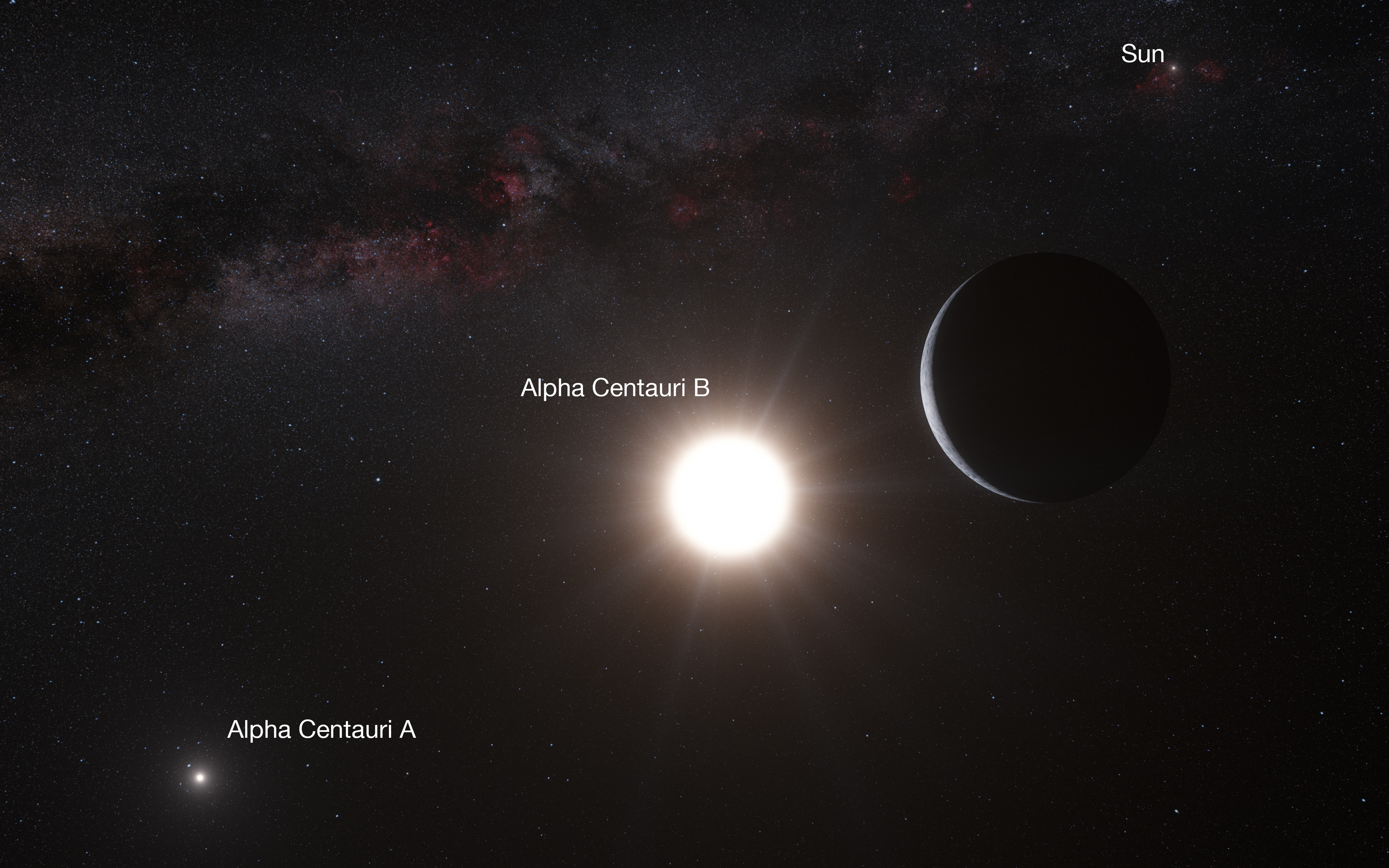
- ESO artist's impression of Alpha Centauri Bb

Discovery
- Discovered by: Dumusque et al.
- Discovery site: La Silla Observatory, Chile
- Discovery date: 16 October 2012
- Detection method: Radial velocity

Orbital characteristics
- Star: Alpha Centauri B

Alpha Centauri Bb (α Cen Bb) was a proposed exoplanet orbiting the K-type main-sequence star Alpha Centauri B (Toliman), located 4.37 light-years from Earth in the southern constellation of Centaurus, but there has not been enough evidence to support the claim.

The claimed discovery of the planet was announced in October 2012 by a team of European observers, and the finding received widespread media attention. However, the announcement was met with scepticism by some astronomers, who thought that the European team was over-interpreting its data.

In October 2015, astronomers from the University of Oxford published a scientific paper disproving the existence of the planet. They observed that an identical statistical analysis of randomly-generated synthetic data gave the same results as the actual astronomical data. This led Xavier Dumusque, the lead author of the original paper, to concede "We are not 100 percent sure, but probably the planet is not there."

== Presumed detection ==
Doppler spectroscopy detects exoplanets by recording variations in the color of light coming from the host star. When a star moves towards Earth, its spectrum is blueshifted, and when it moves away from Earth it is redshifted. By regularly measuring the color spectrum of Alpha Centauri B, and deriving its radial velocity, astronomers deduced the gravitational influence of the planet.

This video shows an artist's rendition of a fly-through of the bright double star Alpha Centauri A and B. In the final sequence it closes in on Alpha Centauri B and a newly discovered planet comes into view. Despite this impressive visualization, the planet was later determined not to exist.

Starting in February 2008, and continuing through July 2011, a team of European astronomers, mainly from the Observatory of Geneva and from the Centre for Astrophysics of the University of Porto, recorded measurements of Alpha Centauri B's radial velocity with European Southern Observatory's HARPS echelle spectrograph at the La Silla Observatory in Chile. The team made 459 observations of Alpha Centauri B's color spectrum over a four-year period, then used statistical filters to remove known sources of variance.

On 16 October 2012, the team announced they had detected an Earth-mass planet in orbit around Alpha Centauri B. The discovery was presented in the scientific journal Nature, with lead author Xavier Dumusque, a graduate student at the University of Porto. He called their findings "a major step towards the detection of a twin Earth in the immediate vicinity of the Sun".

The team used the Doppler spectroscopy method to search for a planet. As the body orbits the host star, its gravity would cause extremely small (semi-amplitude of about 0.5 m/s) periodic shifts in the host star's velocity. Variations of the line-of-sight velocity component cause tiny shifts in the star's spectrum. Using an extremely sensitive spectrometer, the team was able to infer variations of 0.51 m/s in Alpha Centauri B's radial velocity. European Southern Observatory called the findings the most precise measurements ever recorded using the technique. The team estimated the probability of a spurious detection at 0.02%.

== Scepticism and further analysis ==
Dumusque used a variety of mathematical transformations to isolate the planet's gravitational signal and remove the surrounding stellar noise. The transformations filtered out other sources of radial-velocity variance, including effects of starspots, photospheric granulation and rotation, as well as interference from the neighboring star Alpha Centauri A. The final, derived radial-velocity measurements showed the periodic influence of the planet on the star, but were near the threshold of the HARPS instrument's sensory capabilities. (The long-term precision of HARPS is about 0.8 m/s.)

In a commentary piece that ran in Nature alongside the original paper, American exoplanet hunter Artie Hatzes praised the team's technical achievements and admitted he observed a planetlike signal amongst the data, but called it "a weak signal in the presence of a larger, more complicated signal". He stressed the need for further empirical confirmation, and opined that the existence of the planet was "still open to debate". (Hatzes had previously expressed scepticism about unproven methods of data analysis during the dispute over the unconfirmed planet Gliese 581g.)

In October 2015, three years after the announcement of the initial finding, researchers from the University of Oxford published a paper entitled "Ghost in the Time Series", demonstrating flaws in the original analysis. Using the same data as Dumusque, the Oxford team found the signal was caused not by a planet, but instead was a mathematical artifact of the window function used to create the time series for the original observations. To prove this assertion, they replaced the actual astronomical data with randomly-generated noise, and obtained identical results. The team concluded that their analysis "underscores the difficulty of detecting weak planetary signals in RV data". Dumusque agreed with this analysis, and conceded that the planet he had identified probably did not exist.

== See also ==
- Proxima Centauri b (Alpha Centauri Cb)
- Proxima Centauri c
- Alpha Centauri Bc
- Alpha Centauri in fiction
- Project Longshot
