= Initiative for Interstellar Studies =

British nonprofit

The Initiative for Interstellar Studies
- i4is logo
- Abbreviation: i4is
- Formation: 2012
- Founders: Kelvin F. Long, Rob Swinney
- Legal status: Incorporated in the UK as a not-for-profit company limited by guarantee
- Purpose: To conduct activities or research relating to the challenges of achieving robotic and human interstellar flight.
- Location: UK
- Region served: World
- Members: Astronautical engineers Astrophysicists
- Executive Director: Andreas M. Hein
- Main organ: Principium
- Website: www.i4is.org
- Remarks: See also the i4is blog

The Initiative for Interstellar Studies (i4is) is a UK-registered not-for-profit company, whose objectives are education and research into the challenges of interstellar travel. It pioneered concepts of small-scale laser sail interstellar probes (Project Dragonfly) and missions to interstellar objects (Project Lyra). Several of its principals were involved in the 100 Year Starship winning team originated by NASA and DARPA.

The US activities of i4is are coordinated by the Institute for Interstellar Studies, a not-for-profit registered in Tennessee, USA.

== Notable projects and activities ==
=== Project Dragonfly ===
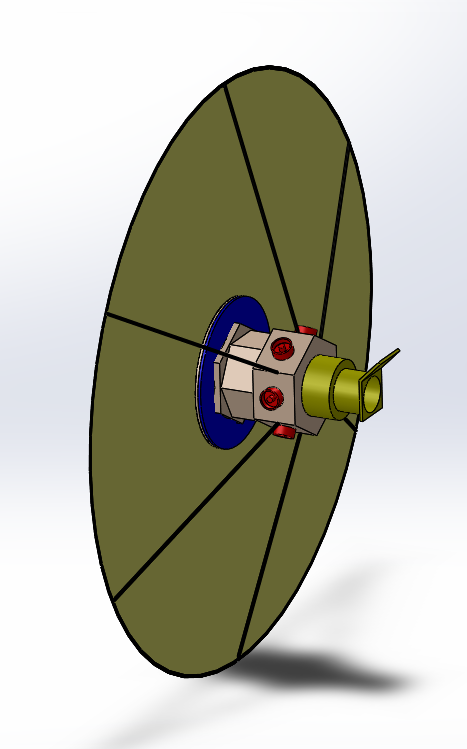
Rendering of the Dragonfly-Probe: This concept won the Project Dragonfly Design Competition

i4is has initiated a project working on small interstellar spacecraft, propelled by a laser sail in 2013 under the name of Project Dragonfly. Four student teams worked on concepts for such a mission in 2014 and 2015 in the context of a design competition. The design of the team from the University of California, Santa Barbara, has subsequently been selected as the baseline system architecture for Breakthrough Starshot. A subsequent study, Project Andromeda, has provided input to Breakthrough Starshot prior to its announcement in 2016.

=== Project Lyra ===
In November 2017, i4is launched Project Lyra and proposed a set of mission concepts for reaching the interstellar objects 1I/ʻOumuamua, 2I/Borisov, and yet to be discovered objects. The project has been featured in numerous media outlets.

=== Project Hyperion - World and generation ships ===
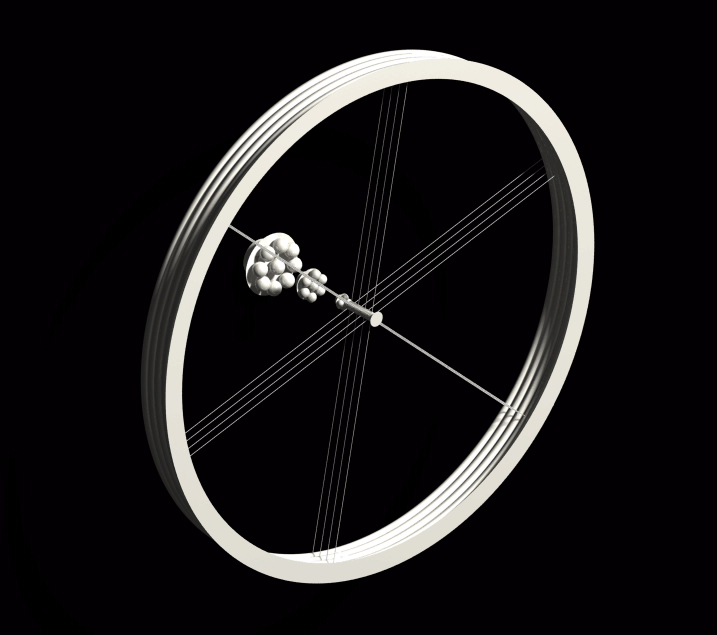
Stanford Torus-based generation ship, proposed by Project Hyperion

i4is has published on world ships, large interstellar generation ships and has presented its results at the ESA Interstellar Workshop in 2019 as well as in ESA's Acta Futura journal. From 2024 to 2025, the Project Hyperion design competition was conducted by i4is.

=== Venus astrobiology mission ===
Subsequent to the alleged discovery of phosphine in the Venusian atmosphere in 2020, i4is published a study on a dedicated astrobiology mission, based on a fleet of balloons to probe the Venusian atmosphere.

=== Principium ===
The i4is published a quarterly magazine, Principium. from 2012 to 2026 when publication was suspended.

== Prominent figures ==
A number of internationally renowned primarily British academics and engineers have had oversight and involvement with the work of the i4is -

- Freeman Dyson FRS, theoretical physicist and mathematician, professor emeritus Institute for Advanced Study was a member of the Advisory Council of the i4is
- Alan Bond, Managing Director of Reaction Engines Limited, is a consultant to i4is.
- Ian Crawford, Professor of Planetary Science and Astrobiology at the Department of Earth and Planetary Sciences, Birkbeck College, University of London is a member of the Advisory Council of the i4is
- Gregory L. Matloff, professor New York City College of Technology is Chair of the Advisory Council of the i4is.
