= Future of space exploration =

Overview of space exploration in the future

The future of space exploration involves both telescopic and physical explorations of space by robotic spacecraft and human spaceflight. Near-term physical exploration missions, focused on obtaining new information about the Solar System, are planned and announced by both national and private organisations.

Tentative plans for crewed orbital and landing missions to the Moon and Mars to establish scientific outposts will later enable permanent and self-sufficient settlements. Further exploration will potentially involve expedition and the other planets and settlements on the Moon, as well as establishing mining and fueling outposts, particularly in the asteroid belt. Physical exploration outside the Solar System will be robotic for the foreseeable future.

== Benefits of space exploration ==
Investment in space exploration has dramatically shifted since the 20th century Space race. Space exploration of the late 20th century was driven by competition between the Soviet Union and the United States to achieve the first spaceflight. Now, the private sector and national governments are again investing in space exploration. However, this time they are motivated by protecting human life from catastrophic events and leveraging the resources of space.

=== Colonization of outer space ===
It has been argued that space colonization is a means of ensuring the survival of human civilization given a planetary disaster. Colonizing other planets allows for the dispersal of humans and thus increases the likelihood of survival given a planetary disaster. The availability of additional resources that can be mined from space could potentially expand the capabilities of humans and largely benefit society. Leveraging these resources and moving high polluting industries to space could reduce the emissions on Earth and ultimately lead to finding cleaner energy sources. The primary blockers to colonizing space include technological and economic challenges.

Many private companies are working to make space travel more efficient in hopes to reduce the overall cost of space travel, and thus space colonization. SpaceX has been a dominant leader in this push for efficient exploration with the release of the Falcon 9, a reusable rocket.

=== Space research ===
The unique attributes of space enable astronauts to conduct research that could not otherwise be done on Earth, and the perspective from space looking at Earth enables scientists to gain more insight on the Earth's natural environment. Research conducted at the International Space Station aims to benefit human civilizations on Earth and extend human knowledge of space and space exploration. Currently, NASA's research at the ISS includes biomedical research, material science, technology advancement, and methods to enable further space exploration.

Anti and microgravity enable astronauts to execute medical research that is impossible to perform on Earth. For example, NASA's research on new treatment options for complex diseases, such as Duchenne Muscular Dystrophy, require the use of a microgravity environment to allow the microparticles in the treatment solution to stay robust. NASA has also reported research investment in microbial vaccine development and microencapsulation of drugs for targeted and more efficient treatment delivery.

== Uncrewed missions ==
=== Breakthrough Starshot ===
Breakthrough Starshot is a research and engineering project by the Breakthrough Initiatives to develop a proof-of-concept fleet of light sail spacecraft named StarChip, to be capable of making the journey to the Alpha Centauri star system 4.37 light-years away. It was founded in 2016 by Yuri Milner, Stephen Hawking, and Mark Zuckerberg.

=== Mars ===
==== Rosalind Franklin ====
Rosalind Franklin, previously known as the ExoMars rover, is a planned robotic Mars rover, part of the international ExoMars programme led by the European Space Agency and the Russian Roscosmos State Corporation.

Initially scheduled to launch in July 2020, but has since been delayed due to testing issues with the rover's landing mechanism. As of May 2022, the launch of the rover is not expected to occur before 2028 due to the need for a new non-Russian landing platform. Once safely landed, the solar powered rover will begin a seven-month (218-sol) mission to search for the existence of past life on Mars. The Trace Gas Orbiter (TGO), launched in 2016, will operate as Rosalind Franklin's and lander's data-relay satellite.

==== Mars Lander Mission ====
Mars Lander Mission, also called Mangalyaan-2. Mars Orbiter Mission 2 (MOM 2), is India's second interplanetary mission planned for launch to Mars by the Indian Space Research Organisation (ISRO). As per some reports emerged, the mission was to be an orbiter to Mars proposed for 2024. However, in a recorded interview in October 2019, VSSC director has indicated the inclusion of a lander and rover. The orbiter will use aerobraking to lower its initial apoapsis and enter into an orbit more suitable for observations.

=== Asteroids ===
An article in science magazine Nature suggested the use of asteroids as a gateway for space exploration, with the ultimate destination being Mars. In order to make such an approach viable, three requirements need to be fulfilled: first, "a thorough asteroid survey to find thousands of nearby bodies suitable for astronauts to visit"; second, "extending flight duration and distance capability to ever-increasing ranges out to Mars"; and finally, "developing better robotic vehicles and tools to enable astronauts to explore an asteroid regardless of its size, shape or spin." Furthermore, using asteroids would provide astronauts with protection from galactic cosmic rays, with mission crews being able to land on them without great risk to radiation exposure

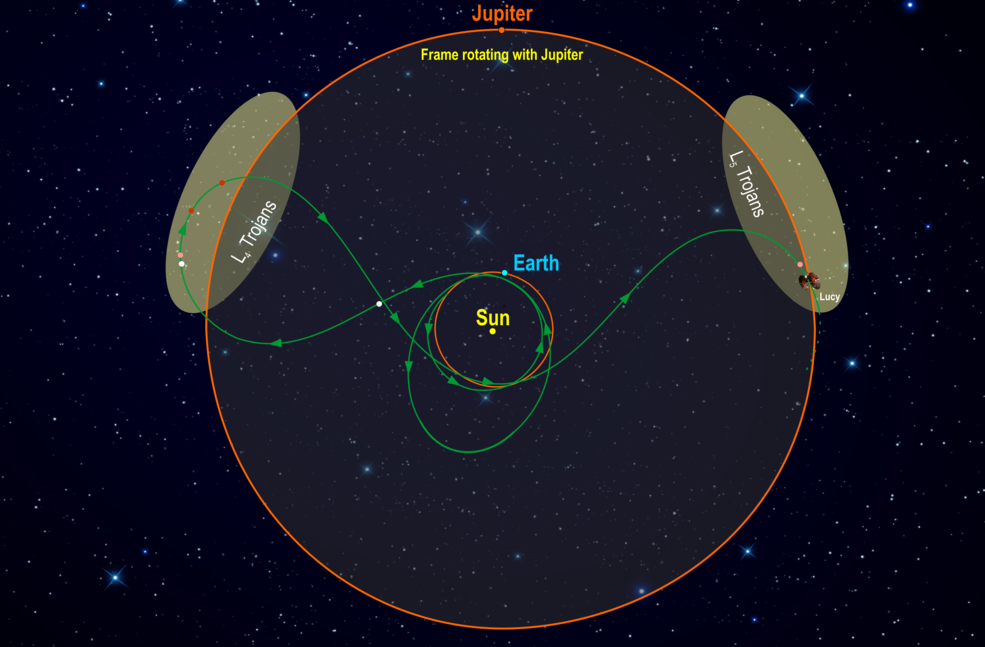
The spacecraft's path (green) is shown in a frame of reference where Jupiter remains stationary. Lucy has two close Earth flybys before encountering its Trojan targets. After 2033, Lucy will continue cycling between the two Trojan clouds every six years.

=== Gas giants ===
==== Breakthrough Enceladus ====
Breakthrough Enceladus is an astrobiology space probe mission concept to explore the possibility of life on Saturn's moon, Enceladus. In September 2018, NASA signed a collaboration agreement with Breakthrough to jointly create the mission concept. This mission would be the first privately funded deep space mission. It would study the content of the plumes ejecting from Enceladus's warm ocean through its southern ice crust. Enceladus's ice crust is thought to be around two to five kilometers thick, and a probe could use an ice-penetrating radar to constrain its structure.

=== Space telescopes ===
==== PLATO ====
Planetary Transits and Oscillations of Stars (PLATO) is a space telescope under development by the European Space Agency for launch in 2026. The mission goals are to search for planetary transits across up to one million stars, and to discover and characterize rocky extrasolar planets around yellow dwarf stars (like the Sun), subgiant stars, and red dwarf stars. The emphasis of the mission is on Earth-like planets in the habitable zone around Sun-like stars where water can exist in liquid state. It is the third medium-class mission in ESA's Cosmic Vision programme and named after the influential Greek philosopher Plato, the founding figure of Western philosophy, science and mathematics. A secondary objective of the mission is to study stellar oscillations or seismic activity in stars to measure stellar masses and evolution and enabling the precise characterization of the planet host star, including its age.

== Crewed missions ==
=== SpaceX Starship ===
The SpaceX Starship is planned to be a spacecraft launched as the second stage of a reusable launch vehicle. The concept is under development by SpaceX, as a private spaceflight project. It is being designed to be a long-duration cargo- and passenger-carrying spacecraft. While it will be tested on its own initially, it will be used on orbital launches with an additional booster stage, the Super Heavy, where Starship would serve as the second stage on a two-stage-to-orbit launch vehicle. The combination of spacecraft and booster is called Starship as well.

=== Boeing Starliner ===
The Boeing CST-100 Starliner is a reusable crew spacecraft developed by Boeing for NASA's Commercial Crew Program to transport astronauts to and from the International Space Station. Starliner first flew with crew on the Boeing Crew Flight Test, launched on 5 June 2024, carrying NASA astronauts Barry "Butch" Wilmore and Sunita Williams to the ISS. The spacecraft returned to Earth uncrewed in September 2024 after propulsion system anomalies were identified during the mission. Wilmore and Williams later returned aboard SpaceX Crew-9 in March 2025. Starliner-1, previously planned as the first operational crewed flight of Starliner, was later changed to an uncrewed cargo mission intended to deliver supplies to the ISS and validate spacecraft upgrades before future crew rotation flights. As of May 2026, NASA listed the launch timing for Starliner-1 as under review.

=== Gaganyaan ===
ISRO's future Gaganyaan mission, which is the first Indian Human Spaceflight Programme, comprises a crew module which is a fully autonomous 5.3-tonne (12,000 lb) spacecraft designed to carry a 3-member crew to orbit and safely return to the Earth after a mission duration of up to seven days. Its 2.9-tonne (6,400 lb) service module is powered by liquid propellant engines. It is to be launched on the GSLV Mk III launcher no earlier than 2022. About 16 minutes after liftoff from the Satish Dhawan Space Centre (SDSC), Sriharikota, the rocket will inject the spacecraft into an orbit 300–400 km (190–250 mi) above Earth. When ready to land, its service module and solar panels will be disposed off before reentry. The capsule would return for a parachute splashdown in the Bay of Bengal.

== Limitations with deep space exploration ==
The future possibilities for deep space exploration are limited by a set of technical, practical, astronomical, and human limitations, which define the future of crewed and uncrewed space exploration. As of 2022, the farthest any human-made probe has traveled is the current NASA mission Voyager 1, 23.61 billion km (14.67 billion mi), around 157.8 AU, from Earth, while the nearest star is around 4.24 light years away, that is the equivalent of 268142.2 AU.

=== Technical limitations ===
The current status of space-faring technology, including propulsion systems, navigation, resources and storage all present limitations to the development of human space exploration in the near future.

==== Distances ====
The astronomical order of magnitude of the distance between Earth and the nearest stars is a challenge for the current development of space exploration. At the current top speed of 70.2 km/s, the Helios 2 probe would arrive at the nearest star, Proxima Centauri, in around 18,000 years, much longer than a human lifespan and therefore requiring much faster transportation methods than currently available. This top speed was achieved due to the Oberth effect where the spacecraft was sped up by a combination of the Sun's gravity and its own propulsion system. The fastest escape velocity from the Solar System is that of Voyager 1 at 17 km/s.

==== Propulsion and fuel ====
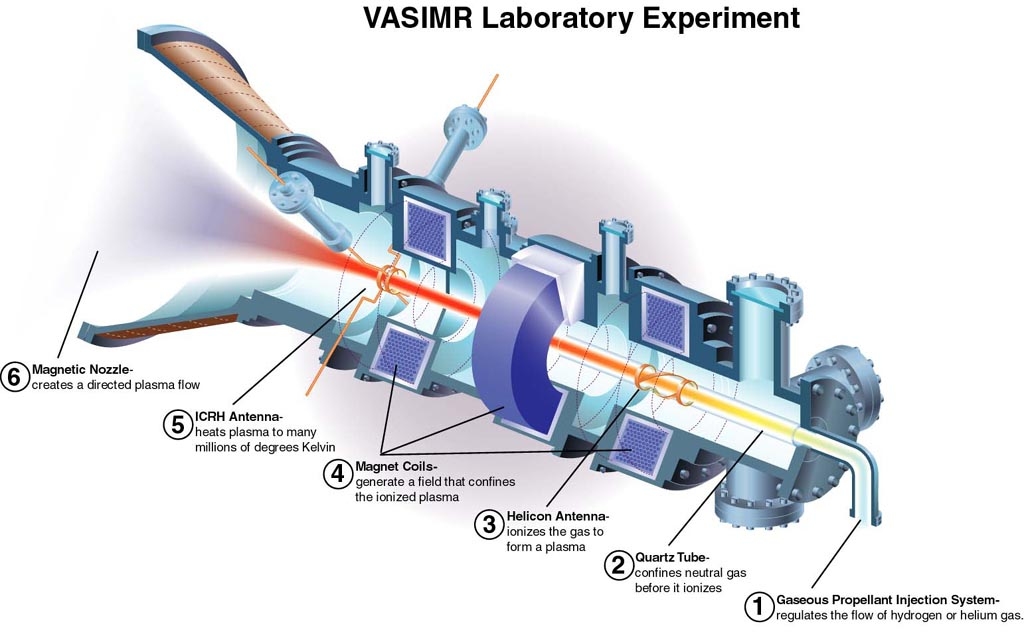
The VASIMR plasma based propulsion engine

In terms of propulsion, the main challenge is the liftoff and initial momentum, since there is no friction in the vacuum of space. Based on the missions goals, including factors such as distance, load and time of flight, the type of propulsion drive used, planned to use, or in design varies from chemical propellants, such as liquid hydrogen and oxidizer (Space Shuttle Main Engine), to plasma or even nanoparticle propellants. Another propulsion system that may be used is ion propulsion.

Project Longshot Nuclear Fission Engine schematic

As for future developments, the theoretical possibilities of nuclear based propulsion have been analyzed over 60 years ago, such as nuclear fusion (Project Daedalus) and nuclear pulse propulsion (Project Longshot), but have since been discontinued from practical research by NASA. On the more speculative side, the theoretical Alcubierre drive presents a mathematical solution for “faster-than-light” travel, but it would require the mass-Energy of Jupiter, not to mention the technical issues.

=== Human limitations ===
The human element in crewed space exploration adds certain physiological and psychological issues and limitations to the future possibilities of space exploration, along with storage and sustenance space and mass issues.

==== Physiological issues ====
The transitioning gravity magnitudes on the body is detrimental to orientation, coordination, and balance. Without constant gravity, bones suffer disuse osteoporosis, and their mineral density falls 12 times faster than the average elderly adult's. Without regular exercise and nourishment, there can be cardiovascular deterioration and loss in muscle strength. Dehydration can cause kidney stones, and constant hydro-static potential in zero-g can shift body fluids upwards and cause vision problems.

Furthermore, without Earth's surrounding magnetic field as a shield, solar radiation has much harsher effects on biological organisms in space. The exposure can include damage to the central nervous system, (altered cognitive function, reducing motor function and incurring possible behavioral changes), as well as the possibility of degenerative tissue diseases.

==== Psychological issues ====
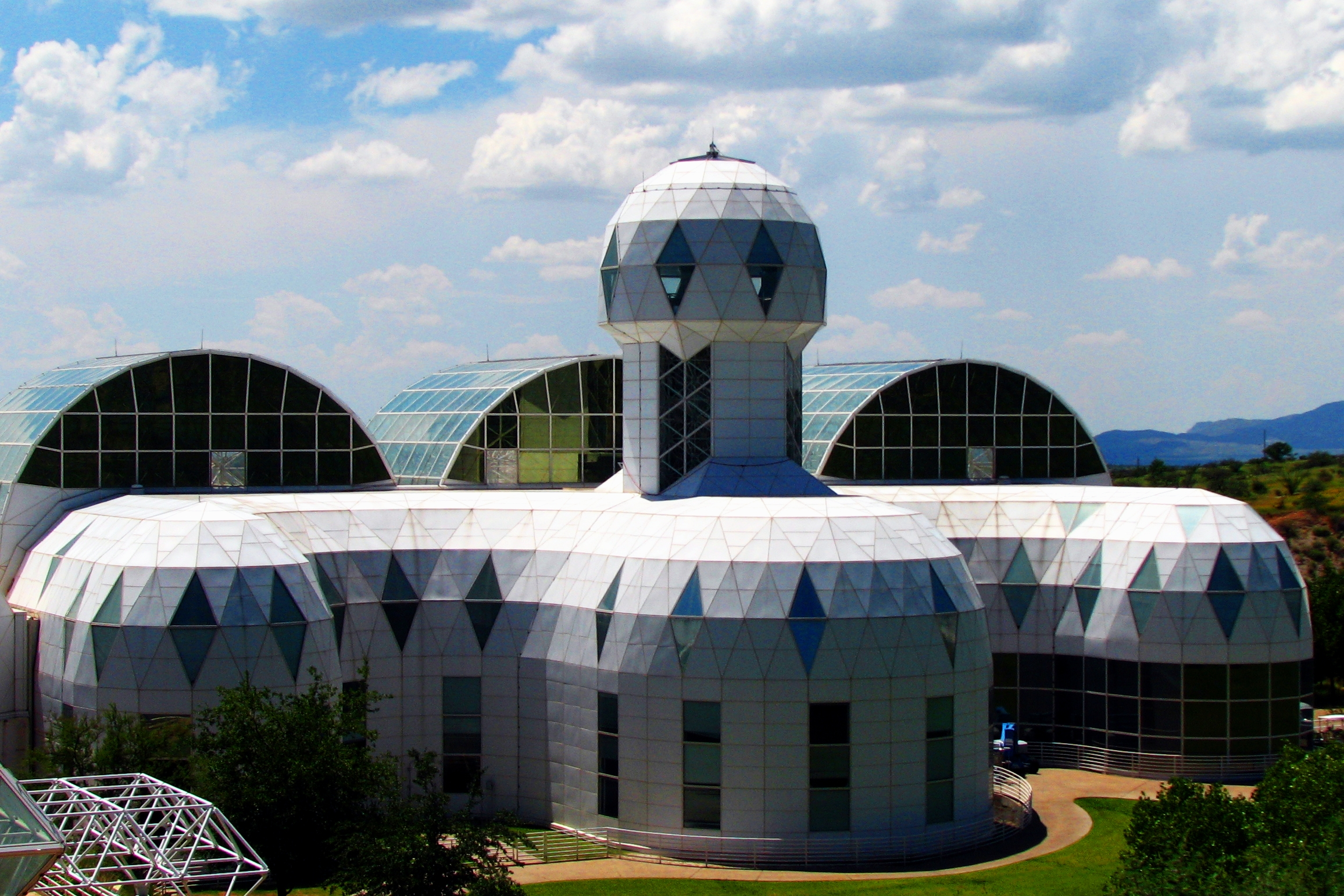
The Biosphere 2 greenhouse habitat

According to NASA, isolation in space can have detrimental effects on the human psyche. Behavioral issues, such as low morale, mood-swings, depression, and decreasing interpersonal interactions, irregular sleeping rhythms, and fatigue occur independently to the level of training, according to a set of NASA's social experiments. The most famous of which, Biosphere 2, was a 2 year long, 8 person crew experiment in the 1990s, in an attempt to study human necessities and survival in an isolated environment. The result of which were stressed interpersonal interactions and aloof behavior, including limiting and even ceasing contact between crew members, along with failing to sustain a lasting air-recycling system and food supply.

==== Resources and sustenance ====
Considering the future possibility of extended, crewed missions, food storage and resupply are relevant limitations. From a storage point of view, NASA estimates a 3-year Mars mission would require around 24 thousand pounds (11 t) of food, most of it in the form of precooked, dehydrated meals of about 1.5 pounds (0.68 kg) a portion. Fresh produce would only be available in the beginning of the flight, since there would not be refrigeration systems. Water's relative heavy weight is a limitation, so on the International Space Station (ISS) the use of water per person is limited to 11 litres (2.9 US gal) a day, compared to the average Americans' 132 litres (35 US gal).

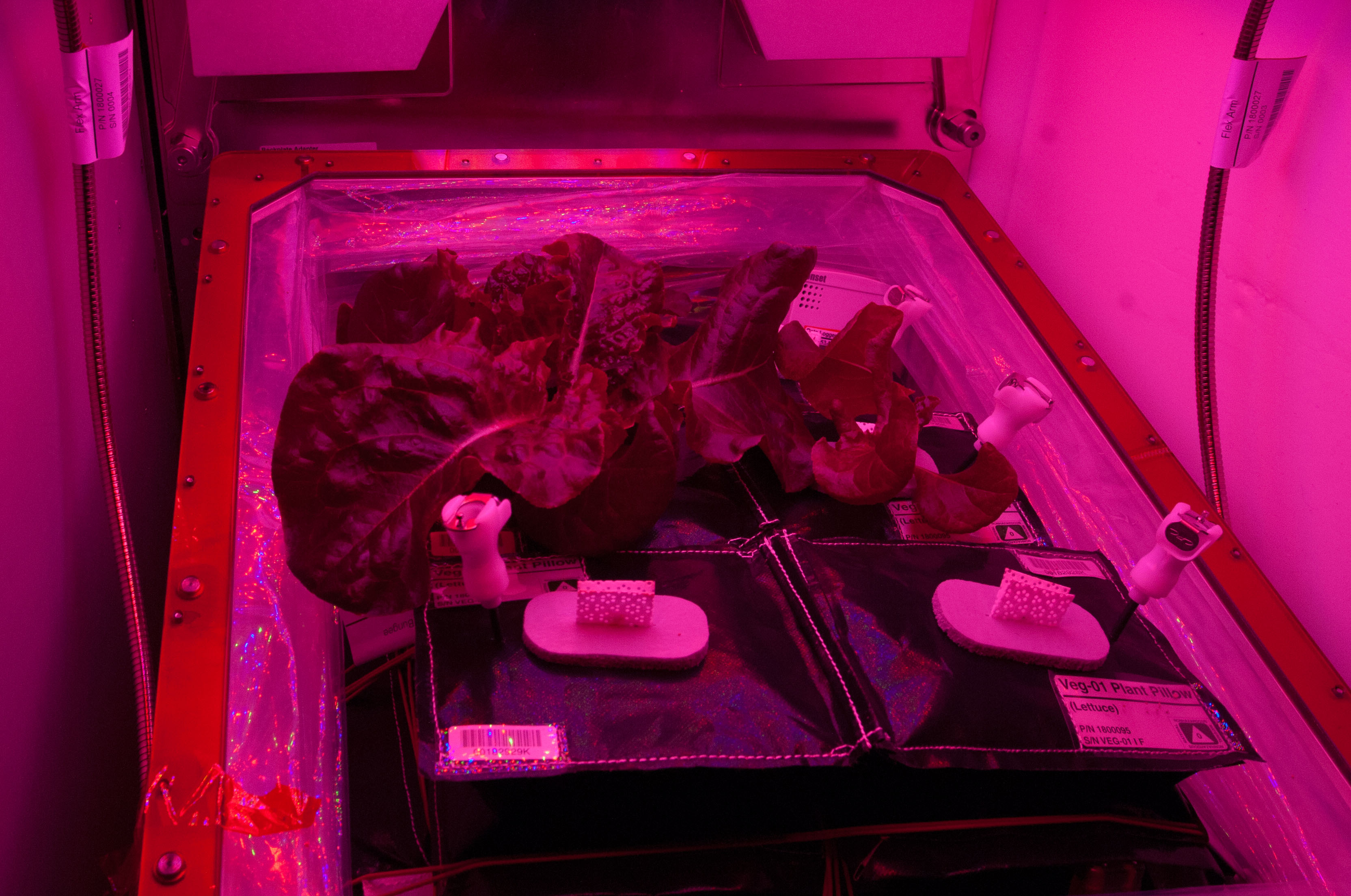
The ISS "Veggie plant growth system" and Red Romaine Lettuce

As for resupply, efforts have been made to recycle, reuse and produce, to make storage more efficient. Water can be produced through chemical reactions of Hydrogen and Oxygen in fuel cells, and attempts and methods of growing vegetables in micro-gravity are being developed and will continue to be researched. Lettuce and chinese cabbage has already successfully grown in the ISS's "Veggie plant growth system", and has been consumed by the astronauts, even though large-scale plant cultivation is still impractical due to factors such as pollination, long growth periods, and the need for development of more efficient growth systems.

== Artificial Intelligence and robotic space craft development ==
The idea of using high level automated systems for space missions has become a desirable goal to space agencies all around the world. Such systems are believed to yield benefits such as lower cost, less human oversight, and ability to explore deeper in space which is usually restricted by long communications with human controllers. Autonomy will be a key technology for the future exploration of the Solar System, where robotic spacecraft will often be out of communication with their human controllers.

=== Autonomous systems ===
Autonomy is defined by three requirements:

1. The ability to make and carry out decisions on their own, based on information on what they sensed from the world and their current state.
2. The ability to interpret the given goal as a list of actions to take.
3. The ability to fail flexibly, meaning they are able to continuously change their actions based on what is happening within their system and their surrounding.

Currently, there are many projects trying to advance space exploration and space craft development using AI.

==== NASA's autonomous science experiment ====
NASA began its autonomous science experiment (ASE) on Earth Observing-1 (EO-1), which is NASA's first satellite in the millennium program, Earth-observing series launched on November 21, 2000. The autonomy of these satellites is capable of on-board science analysis, re-planning, robust execution, and model-based diagnostic. Images obtained by the EO-1 are analyzed on-board and down linked when a change or interesting event occurs. The ASE software has successfully provided over 10,000 science images. This experiment was the start of many that NASA devised for AI to impact the future of space exploration.

==== Artificial Intelligence Flight Adviser ====
NASA's goal with this project is to develop a system that can aid pilots by giving them real-time expert advice in situations that pilot training does not cover or just aid with a pilot's train of thought during flight. Based on the IBM Watson cognitive computing system, the AI Flight Adviser pulls data from a large database of relevant information like aircraft manuals, accident reports, and close-call reports to give advice to pilots. In the future, NASA wants to implement this technology to create fully autonomous systems, which can then be used for space exploration. In this case, cognitive systems will serve as the basis, and the autonomous system will completely decide on the course of action of the mission, even during unforeseen situations. However, in order for this to happen, there are still many supporting technologies required.

In the future, NASA hopes to use this technology not only in flights on earth, but for future space exploration. Essentially, NASA plans to modify this AI flight Advisor for Longer range applications. In addition to what the technology is now, there will be additional cognitive computing systems that can decide on the right set of actions based upon unforeseen problems in space. However, in order for this to be possible, there are still many supporting technologies that need to be enhanced.

==== Stereo vision for collision avoidance ====
For this project, NASA's goal is to implement stereo vision for collision avoidance in space systems to work with and support autonomous operations in a flight environment. This technology uses two cameras within its operating system that have the same view, but when put together offer a large range of data that gives a binocular image. Because of its duo-camera system, NASA's research indicate that this technology can detect hazards in rural and wilderness flight environments. Because of this project, NASA has made major contributions toward developing a completely autonomous UAV. Currently, Stereo Vision can construct a stereo vision system, process the vision data, make sure the system works properly, and lastly performs tests figuring out the range of impeding objects and terrain. In the future, NASA hopes this technology can also determine the path to avoid collision. The near-term goal for the technology is to be able to extract information from point clouds and place this information in a historic map data. Using this map, the technology could then be able to extrapolate obstacles and features in the stereo data that are not in the map data. This would aid with the future of space exploration where humans can't see moving, impeding objects that may damage the moving space craft.

=== Benefits of AI ===
Autonomous technologies would be able to perform beyond predetermined actions. They would analyze all possible states and events happening around them and come up with a safe response. In addition, such technologies can reduce launch cost and ground involvement. Performance would increase as well. Autonomy would be able to quickly respond upon encountering an unforeseen event, especially in deep space exploration where communication back to Earth would take too long. Space exploration could provide us with the knowledge of our universe as well as incidentally developing inventions and innovations. Traveling to Mars and farther could encourage the development of advances in medicine, health, longevity, transportation, communications that could have applications on Earth.

=== Robotic spacecraft development ===
==== Energy ====
===== Solar panels =====
Changes in space craft development will have to account for an increased energy need for future systems. Spacecraft heading towards the center of the Solar System will include enhanced solar panel technology to make use of the abundant solar energy surrounding them. Future solar panel development is aimed at their working more efficiently while being lighter.

===== Radioisotope Thermoelectric Generators =====
Radioisotope Thermoelectric Generators (RTEG or RTG) are solid-state devices which have no moving parts. They generate heat from the radioactive decay of elements such as plutonium, and have a typical lifespan of more than 30 years. In the future, atomic sources of energy for spacecraft will hopefully be lighter and last longer than they do currently. They could be particularly useful for missions to the Outer Solar System which receives substantially less sunlight, meaning that producing a substantial power output with solar panels would be impractical.

== The private sector and space commercialization ==
NASA continues to focus on solving more difficult problems involving space exploration such as deep space capabilities and improving human life support systems. With that said, NASA has placed the challenge of commercializing space to the private space industry with the hopes of developing innovations which help improve human living conditions in space. Commercialization of space in the private sector will lead to reducing flight costs, developing new methods of sustaining human life in space, and will provide the opportunity for tourists to experience Low Earth orbit travel in the future.

=== Limitations to space commercialization ===
Experiencing Low Earth Orbit as a tourist requires accommodations to allow for humans to fly or spend time in space. These accommodations will need to solve the following problems:

1. Physiological effects of living in microgravity will affect your body's chemistry and invoke symptoms such as motion sickness from disorientation. Long term gradual effects from time in space include Bone atrophy from a gravity scarce environment that limits the flow of minerals throughout the body.

2. Upcoming habitats are designed for effective transport on rocket systems which means these habitats are small and confined leading to confinement problems and physiological changes in behavior like claustrophobia.

3. Residing in Earth's orbit removes the protections of the Ozone layer which absorbs harmful radiation emitted from the Sun. Living in orbit around Earth exposes humans to ten times more radiation than humans living on Earth. These radiative effects can invoke symptoms such as skin cancer.

Company Advancements in Commercialization

=== Commercialization of space ===
==== SpaceX ====
In 2017 Elon Musk announced the development of rocket travel to transport humans from one city to another in under an hour. Elon has challenged SpaceX to improve travel across the world through his reusable rocket propulsion to send up passengers on a suborbital trajectory to their destination.

==== Virgin Galactic ====
The company Virgin Galactic with CEO Sir Richard Branson is developing another method to reach planes through Aircraft propulsion. Named SpaceshipTwo which is a biplane that carries a spacecraft as its payload known as White Knight Two and carries it to cruising altitude where the rocket separates and begins to climb out of Earth's atmosphere.

=== Blue Origin ===
==== New Shepard ====
The Blue Origin website highlights a small launch vehicle sending payloads into orbit. The goal is to reduce the cost of sending smaller payloads into orbit with future intentions to send humans into space. The first stage is reusable while the second stage is expendable. Maximum payload dimensions are expected to be around 530 cubic feet to be carried past the Karman line.

==== New Glenn ====
The larger variant of the New Shepard, Blue Origin seeks to increase their payload capabilities by developing a 95-meter-tall rocket capable of reusable flight to space. Its payload is expected to be satellites or to provide humans with the opportunity to view space without astronaut training. Blue Origin intends the rocket's reusability to last 25 flights into space alleviating costs increasing the possibility of commercialized travel.

==== Blue Moon ====
Blue Origin's lunar lander is designed to be a flexible lander with capabilities to send both cargo and crew to the lunar surface. This habitat will provide a sustained human presence by providing necessities such as life support systems and lunar rovers to excavate and scout the surrounding lunar surface. Further developments on this project include a Human Landing system which are detachable living quarters intended to attach and depart from the Blue Moon Lunar Lander.

==== Bigelow Aerospace Expandable Activity Module ====
The Bigelow Aerospace Corporation founded by Robert Bigelow is headquartered in Las Vegas. A research and development company with emphasis on constructing space architecture capable of housing humans and creating living conditions suitable for living in space. The company has sent two subscale spacecraft known as Genesis I and II into Low Earth Orbit along with sending a module known as Bigelow Expandable Activity Module (BEAM) which is inflated and attached to the International Space Station. The BEAM Module is measured to be 14 feet in length and can be inflated or deflated for ease of transportation. Bigelow Aerospace is working toward developing their own Modules independent of the International Space Station to send tourists and visitors.

== See also ==
- Space exploration
- List of proposed space observatories
- Human mission to Mars
- Space colonization
