= Project Icarus (interstellar) =

2009 project to update design of Project Daedalus

Project Icarus is a theoretical engineering design study aimed at designing a credible, mainly nuclear fusion-based, uncrewed interstellar space probe. Project Icarus was an initiative of members of the British Interplanetary Society (BIS) and the Tau Zero Foundation (TZF) started in 2009. The project was under the stewardship of Icarus Interstellar until 2019. It remains a BIS project.

The project was planned to take around five years and began formally on September 30, 2009. An international team of scientists and engineers was assembled and a number of papers were published on many aspects of Interstellar flight during the active phase of the project.

== History ==
Project Icarus was founded primarily by Kelvin Long and Richard Obousy. The project was first announced at a conference at the United Kingdom Space Conference, held at Charterhouse, Surrey on 4 April 2009, when Kelvin Long had organized the first interstellar session. He then approached Richard Obousy about helping to set up the project. A symposium was organized by Kelvin Long and Ian Crawford at the British Interplanetary Society to review "Daedalus After 30 Years". As well as presentations from Long, Obousy and Crawford, it included presentations from future team members Richard Osborne, Martyn Fogg and Andreas Tziolas. Other future team members in the audience that day included Pat Galea and Rob Swinney. The genesis of the project is described in the original paper as well as a history paper.

Project Icarus focused on the technology challenges of interstellar travel. "The required milestones should be defined in order to get to a potential launch of such a mission. This should include a credible design, mission profile, key technological development steps and other aspects as considered appropriate." These goals are to be achieved by technical reports on engineering layout, functionality, physics, operation and other aspects of such an interstellar ship.

While Daedalus had relied on helium-3 propulsion depending on mining Neptune or Jupiter to produce sufficient helium-3; several other fuel sources and fusion types were researched.

Members of the Project Icarus study group went on to form a 501(c)(3) nonprofit organization called Icarus Interstellar, which then launched various other projects other than just Project Icarus. Icarus Interstellar has the mission of seeing interstellar flight achieved by the year 2100.

In September 2011, Project Icarus received a mention in the BBC's The Sky at Night programme.

=== 2013 Project Icarus design competition ===
In 2013 a design competition internal to Icarus Interstellar was launched. During a final workshop at the British Interplanetary Society in October 2013 a team from the WARR student group of the Technical University of Munich under the leadership of Andreas M. Hein was nominated as the winner.

Icarus Firefly, one of the competing designs, was later sufficiently developed to be presented as an article in the Journal of the British Interplanetary Society.

=== 2019 Project review ===
The supervision of the project by Icarus Interstellar ended in 2019, after failing to produce a workable, updated starship design. However, many papers were published as elements of the project, and the state of the art of Interstellar travel was advanced. A review of the project was published in 2020.

A number of members moved on to I4IS, the Initiative for Interstellar Studies or to Breakthrough Starshot. Project Icarus remains a British Interplanetary Society project, but has seen little activity since 2019.

== Former Team members ==
The Project Team was worldwide group made up of volunteers who were members of Icarus Interstellar or of the British Interplanetary Society. It had some notable members such as:

- Stephen Baxter, a science fiction author who is one of the designers
- Vint Cerf, the American internet pioneer who is one of the project consultants

== See also ==
- Breakthrough Starshot
- Interstellar travel
- Nuclear pulse propulsion
- Project Daedalus
- Project Longshot
- Spacecraft propulsion
