= Nano-particle field extraction thruster =

The Nano-particle field extraction thruster or NanoFET is an experimental high-speed spacecraft engine under development by the University of Michigan. It provides thrust by emitting charged particles. These particles are cylindrical carbon nanotubes which can either be contained in tanks or manufactured in-flight. By varying the size of these particles, the nanoFET can vary its fuel efficiency (specific impulse), and consequently the amount of thrust output, while maintaining high power efficiency. Like other electric propulsion systems, the nanoFET is not intended for operation inside Earth's atmosphere but for operations in orbit and deep space.

== Principle ==
The nanoFET's adjustable force and specific impulse make it extremely versatile. It can produce more thrust while using less power and fuel than any other electronic thrust system. In addition, no charge is built up within the system as a whole; any negative charge built up on one charging pad is canceled by the positive charge built up on another. The high level of integration with its fuel containers makes it extremely compact and easy to place in a space ship. Unfortunately, like all other electronic thrusters, it produces nowhere near the amount of thrust that current chemical rockets produce (a few hundred Newtons compared to ~15 million Newtons). Although the fact that it doesn't need a few million pounds of fuel does significantly offset this power difference, in their current form, nanoFETs are not suitable for earth based launches.

A nanoFET works in a fairly straightforward manner. It consists of three main parts: a particle storage area, a charging pad, and an acceleration grid. To start, it transports cylindrical particles to the charging pad which then imposes a charge on the particles. As the particle gains charge, the pulling force from the acceleration grid increases. Eventually, this pulling force overpowers the electro-magnetic and surface adhesion forces between the particles and charging pad. Now the particle begins accelerating towards the acceleration grid until it is shot out of the nanoFET, consequently pushing the nanoFET in the opposite direction.

There are two types of nanoFET, a dry-nanoFET and the "normal" wet-nanoFET. The prefix refers to their method of particle transportation, a wet-nanoFET uses liquid whereas a dry does not.

=== Wet-NanoFET ===
Most prototypes and testing up to now has been done on a wet-nanoFET. This design uses a low surface-tension, low viscosity, and non-conductive liquid to transport and/or store cylindrical particles. These particles are carbon-nano-tubes ranging in size from 1 to 100 nm. Issues with this design involve the potential for colloid formation, the liquid vaporizing in space, and the increased space and weight.

=== Dry-NanoFET ===
This variation looks to be better than the wet-nanoFET as it has none of the liquid based problems of the wet-nanoFET. Unfortunately, not much information has been released on how it manages to transport particles to the charging pad. Once at the charging pad, it uses a piezoelectric layer to get the particles moving and to get them off the charging pad. This breaks the adhesion force and severely reduces their attraction to the charging pad, allowing the acceleration grid to start pulling them out.

== Challenges ==
As can be imagined, there were plenty of challenges encountered while designing the nanoFET. One of the main ones was how to transport particles to the charging pad. While a liquid is the easiest way to transport the particles, it can form tiny cones (Taylor cones) and charged droplets (colloids), which severely affect a nanoFET's ability to fine tune its thrust. Initially, non-conductive liquids with low surface tension and viscosity, such as 100cSt silicon oil, were found to be able to withstand a large electro-magnetic field without forming colloids. Later on, prototypes using dry mechanisms to transport the particles were developed. These dry-nanoFET configurations use electronically actuated materials (piezoelectrics) to break surface tension and get the particles moving.

Similarly, spherical particles were used in early prototypes but were later substituted with cylindrical particles. This is mainly because cylindrical particles gain much more charge than spherical particles, as they stand on end when being charged. Given also that cylinders penetrate a liquid's surface more easily and take less liquid with them, they are the ideal shape for a nanoFET. These properties allow cylindrical nano-particles to be extracted, whereas the smallest extractable spheres are on the order of millimeters.
