= Project Daedalus =

1970s proposal for an interstellar probe

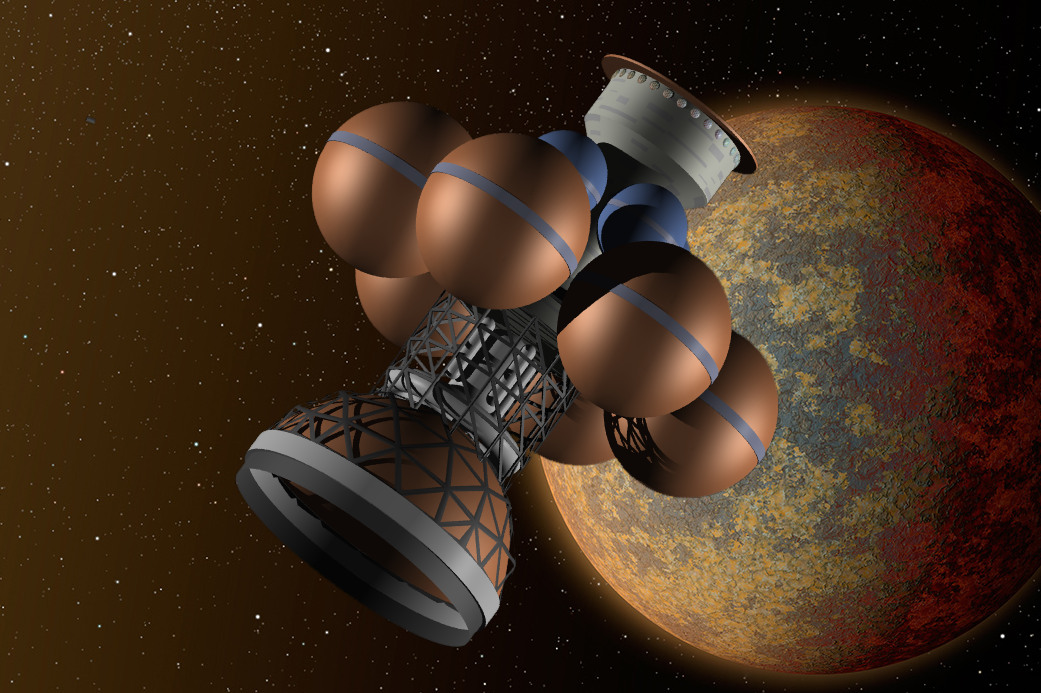
Daedalus spacecraft concept

Project Daedalus (named after Daedalus, the Greek mythological designer who crafted wings for human flight) was a study conducted between 1973 and 1978 by the British Interplanetary Society to design a plausible uncrewed interstellar probe. Intended mainly as a scientific probe, the design criteria specified that the spacecraft had to use existing or near-future technology and had to be able to reach its destination within a human lifetime. Alan Bond led a team of scientists and engineers who proposed using a fusion rocket to reach Barnard's Star 5.9 light years away. The trip was estimated to take 50 years, but the design was required to be flexible enough that it could be sent to any other target star.

All the papers produced by the study are available in a BIS book, Project Daedalus: Demonstrating the Engineering Feasibility of Interstellar Travel.

== Concept ==
Daedalus would be constructed in Earth orbit and have an initial mass of 54,000 tonnes including 50,000 tonnes of fuel and 500 tonnes of scientific payload. Daedalus was to be a two-stage spacecraft. The first stage would operate for two years, accelerating the spacecraft to 7.1% of light speed (0.071 c), and then after it was jettisoned, the second stage would fire for 1.8 years, accelerating the spacecraft to about 12% of light speed (0.12 c), before shutting down for a 46-year cruise period. Given the extreme temperature range of operation required, from near absolute zero to 1600 K, the engine bells, and support structure would be made of molybdenum alloyed with titanium, zirconium, and carbon, which retains strength even at cryogenic temperatures. A major stimulus for the project was Friedwardt Winterberg's inertial confinement fusion drive concept, for which he received the Hermann Oberth gold medal award.

This speed is well beyond the capabilities of chemical rockets or even the type of nuclear pulse propulsion studied during Project Orion. According to project co-lead Tony Martin, controlled-fusion engines and the nuclear–electric systems have very low thrust because equipment to convert nuclear energy into electrical has a large mass which results in small acceleration, taking a century to achieve the desired speed (for example 15% of the speed of light, thus unsuitable for interstellar flight during a single human lifetime); thermodynamic nuclear engines of the NERVA type require a great quantity of fuel. Photon rockets have to generate power at a rate of 3×10^{9} W per kg of vehicle mass and require mirrors with absorptivity of less than 1 part in 10^{6}. Interstellar ramjet's problems are the tenuous interstellar medium with a density of about 1 atom/cm^{3}, a large diameter funnel, and high power required for its electric field. Thus the only suitable propulsion method for the project was thermonuclear pulse propulsion.

Daedalus would be propelled by a fusion rocket using pellets of a deuterium/helium-3 mix that would be ignited in the reaction chamber by inertial confinement using electron beams. The electron beam system would be powered by a set of induction coils trapping energy from the plasma exhaust stream. 250 pellets would be detonated per second, and the resulting plasma would be directed by a magnetic nozzle. The computed burn-up fraction for the fusion fuels was 0.175 and 0.133 producing exhaust velocities of 10,600 km/s and 9,210 km/s respectively. Because helium-3 is scarce on Earth, it was to be mined from the atmosphere of Jupiter by large hot-air balloon–supported robotic factories over a 20-year period, or from a less distant source, such as the Moon.

The second stage would have two 5-metre optical telescopes and two 20-metre radio telescopes. About 25 years after launch these telescopes would begin examining the area around Barnard's Star to learn more about any accompanying planets. This information would be sent back to Earth, using the 40-metre diameter second stage engine bell as a communications dish, and targets of interest would be selected. Since the spacecraft would not decelerate, upon reaching Barnard's Star, Daedalus would carry 18 autonomous sub-probes that would be launched between 7.2 and 1.8 years before the main craft entered the target system. These sub-probes would be propelled by nuclear-powered ion drives and would carry cameras, spectrometers, and other sensory equipment. The sub-probes would fly past their targets, still travelling at 12% of the speed of light, and transmit their findings back to the Daedalus' second stage, mothership, for relay back to Earth.

The ship's payload bay containing its sub-probes, telescopes, and other equipment would be protected from the interstellar medium during transit by a beryllium disc, up to 7 mm thick, weighing up to 50 tonnes. This erosion shield would be made from beryllium for its lightness and high latent heat of vaporisation. Larger obstacles that might be encountered while passing through the target system would be dispersed by an artificially generated cloud of particles, ejected by support vehicles called dust bugs about 200 km ahead of the vehicle. The spacecraft would carry a number of robot wardens capable of autonomously repairing damage or malfunctions.

== Specifications ==
- Overall length: 190 metres
- Payload mass: 450 tonnes

Property	First stage	Second stage
Empty mass	1,690 tonnes (at staging)	980 tonnes (at cruise speed)
Propellant mass	46,000 tonnes	4,000 tonnes
Engine burn time	2.05 years	1.76 years
Thrust	7,540,000 newtons	663,000 newtons
Engine exhaust velocity	10,600,000 m/s	9,210,000 m/s
Delta-V	35,000,000 m/s (0.117c)	13,000,000 m/s (0.0432c)

== Variants ==
A quantitative engineering analysis of a self-replicating variation on Project Daedalus was published in 1980 by Robert Freitas. The non-replicating design was modified to include all subsystems necessary for self-replication. Use the probe to deliver a seed factory, with a mass of about 443 metric tons, to a distant site. Have the seed factory replicate many copies of itself on-site, to increase its total manufacturing capacity, then use the resulting automated industrial complex to construct probes, with a seed factory on board, over a 1,000-year period. Each REPRO would weigh over 10 million tons, laden with the extra fuel needed to decelerate from 12% of lightspeed.

Another possibility is to equip the Daedalus with a magnetic sail similar to the magnetic scoop on a Bussard ramjet to use the destination star heliosphere as a brake, making carrying deceleration fuel unnecessary, allowing a much more in-depth study of the star system chosen.

== See also ==
- Breakthrough Starshot
- Project Icarus
- Project Longshot
- Enzmann starship
