= Mar Mezcua =

Spanish astrophysicist

Mar Mezcua Pallerola is a Spanish astrophysicist known for her research on black holes, and especially the intermediate-mass black holes, of masses intermediate between the stellar black holes created in supernovas, and the supermassive black holes at the centers of galaxies. She is a staff scientist at the Institut de Ciències de l'Espai (Institute of Space Sciences), in Barcelona.

== Education and career ==
Mezcua earned a degree in physics, specializing in astrophysics, through studies at three universities: the Autonomous University of Barcelona from 2002 to 2005, the University of La Laguna from 2005 to 2007, and (as an Erasmus scholar) the University of Göttingen from 2007 to 2008. Following this, she earned a Ph.D. in 2011 through the Max Planck Institute for Radio Astronomy and University of Cologne.

After postdoctoral stints at the Instituto de Astrofísica de Canarias, Harvard–Smithsonian Center for Astrophysics, University of Montreal, and Institute of Space Sciences, she obtained a permanent position as a staff scientist at the Institute of Space Sciences in 2021.
