= Guillem Anglada-Escudé =

Spanish astronomer

Guillem Anglada-Escude
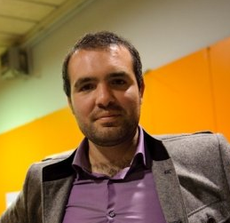
- Guillem Anglada
- Born: 1979 (age 46–47); Ullastrell, Catalonia, Spain
- Education: University of Barcelona PhD
- Known for: Search for extrasolar planets
- Awards: Time 100 list of the most influential people in the world (2017)
- Scientific career
- Fields: Astronomy, Planetary science, Astrophysics
- Institutions: Institut de Ciències de l'Espai (2019-); Queen Mary University of London (2013–2019) University of Hertfordshire (2014-2015) University of Göttingen (2012-2013) Carnegie Institution of Washington (2008-2011)
- Thesis: Experiments and relativistic models for optical astrometry from space. Application to the Gaia mission (2007)
- Doctoral advisor: Jordi Torra, Sergei A. Klioner
- Website: www.ice.csic.es/en/content/4/staff/by-role/0/all

External videos
- “Lo que significa el descubrimiento de Próxima b”, TEDx Valladolid 2017
- “Guillem Anglada-Escudé: Breakthrough Discuss 2017”, Stanford University 2017
- “Journey to the Pale Red Dot”, 2017

Guillem Anglada-Escudé (born 1979) is a Spanish astronomer. In 2016, he led a team of astronomers under the Pale Red Dot campaign, which resulted in the confirmation of the existence of Proxima Centauri b, the closest potentially habitable extrasolar planet to Earth, followed by the publication of a peer-reviewed article in Nature. In 2017, Anglada-Escudé was named amongst the 100 most influential people according to Time, and one of Nature's top 10 scientists of the year 2016. He is currently a research fellow at Institut de Ciències de l'Espai.

== Publications ==
- Anglada-Escudé, Guillem; Amado, Pedro J.; Barnes, John; et al. (2016). "A terrestrial planet candidate in a temperate orbit around Proxima Centauri". Nature. 536 (7617): 437–440. arXiv:1609.03449. Bibcode:2016Natur.536..437A. doi:10.1038/nature19106. PMID 27558064. S2CID 4451513.
- Anglada-Escudé, Guillem; Arriagada, Pamela; Tuomi, Mikko; Zechmeister, Mathias; Jenkins, James S.; Ofir, Aviv; Dreizler, Stefan; Gerlach, Enrico; Marvin, Christopher J.; Reiners, Ansgar; Jeffers, Sandra V.; Butler, R. Paul; Vogt, Steven S.; Amado, Pedro J.; Rodríguez-López, Cristina; Berdiñas, Zaira M.; Morin, Julien; Crane, Jeffrey D.; Shectman, Stephen A.; Thompson, I. B.; Díaz, M.; Rivera, Eugenio; Sarmiento, Luis F.; Jones, Hugh R. A. (2014). "Two planets around Kapteyn's star: a cold and a temperate super-Earth orbiting the nearest halo red dwarf" (PDF). Monthly Notices of the Royal Astronomical Society. 443 (1): L89–L93. doi:10.1093/mnrasl/slu076.
- Anglada-Escudé, Guillem; Butler, R. Paul (2012). "The HARPS-TERRA project I. Description of the algorithms, performance and new measurements on a few remarkable stars observed by HARPS". The Astrophysical Journal. 200 (2): 15. arXiv:1202.2570. Bibcode:2012ApJS..200...15A. doi:10.1088/0067-0049/200/2/15. S2CID 118528839.
- Anglada-Escudé, Guillem; Plavchan, Peter; Mills, Sean; Gao, Peter; García-Berríos, Edgardo; Lewis, Nathan S.; Sung, Keeyoon; Ciardi, David; Beichman, Charles A.; Brinkworth, Carolyn; Johnson, John; Davison, Cassy; White, Russel; Prato, Lisa (2012). "Design and Construction of Absorption Cells for Precision Radial Velocities in the K Band Using Methane Isotopologues". Publications of the Astronomical Society of the Pacific. 124 (916): 586–597. arXiv:1205.1388. Bibcode:2012PASP..124..586A. doi:10.1086/666489. JSTOR 10.1086/666489. S2CID 24552613.
