= Yakiv Pavlenko =

Ukrainian astronomer, astrophysicist (1954–2024)

Yakiv Volodymyrovych Pavlenko
- Павленко Яків Володимирович
- Born: 24 January 1954; Makalevichi, Ukraine
- Died: 19 October 2024 (aged 70); Ukraine
- Education: Kyiv University
- Awards: 2009: Prize after Barabashov of the National Academy of Sciences of Ukraine; 2014: State Prize of Ukraine in Science and Technology; 2016: Basic Science Book Award of the International Academy of Astronautics
- Scientific career
- Fields: Astrophysics, astronomy
- Workplaces: MAO NASU
- Thesis: Formation of lithium lines in atmosheres of late-type stars without LTE (1996)
- Website: mao.kiev.ua/staff/yp/

Yakiv Volodymyrovych Pavlenko (24 January 1954 – 19 October 2024) was a Ukrainian astronomer and astrophysicist, who researched low-mass stars and exocomets.

== Early life and education ==
He was born in 1954 in Makalevychi village, Zhytomyr region, Ukraine. Pavlenko graduated from Kyiv University in 1976 with a Master's degree in Astronomy and Physics. He was a student of Mykola Avenirovych Yakovkin, a son of Avenir Aleksandrovich Yakovkin.

Pavlenko was an Aspirant at Tartu Observatory (Estonia) in 1979–1982, where he received a Candidate of Sciences degree in Astrophysics and Radioastronomy in 1984. He received a Doctor of Science degree in Astrophysics and Radioastronomy at MAO NASU in 1996.

== Career and research ==
Pavlenko worked at the Main Astronomy Observatory of the National Academy of Sciences of Ukraine (MAO NASU) from 1983. From 1994, he was a Senior Research Fellow. From 2017, Pavlenko headed the Department of Physics of Substellar and Planetary Systems of MAO NASU. In 2023, Pavlenko become Chief Research Fellow at the Department of Physics of Substellar and Planetary Systems of MAO NASU.

Beginning in 1989, Pavlenko collaborated with the research group on Exoplanets and Astrobiology of the Instituto de Astrofísica de Canarias (IAC).

In January 2020, Mario Damasso and colleagues published a paper on the discovery of Proxima Centauri c, the second exoplanet near Proxima Centauri. To exclude fluctuations in spectrum resulted of red dwarf flare activity, Damasso used research work by Pavlenko and others at IAC on analysing spectrography data of HARPS mission.

In 2022, a paper with the results of exocomets research and discovery of 5 new exocomets, written by Pavlenko together with others at MAO NASU, was published in the journal Astronomy & Astrophysics. In autumn of that year, he visited IAC to model the atmospheres of brown dwarf and exoplanets objects.

In addition to his research work, Pavlenko was a lecturer and examiner, and was one of editors of the journal Kinematics and Physics of Celestial Bodies. From 2023, he was an expert adviser to the Science at Risk! project, a Ukrainian digital platform that disseminates information on the effects of war on scientific research in Ukraine.

== Personal life ==
Pavlenko's wife, Larysa Yakovina, has a PhD in astrophysics; they have a daughter.

Yakiv Pavlenko died on 19 October 2024, at the age of 70. Yaroslav Yatskiv published an obituary on the MAO NASU site.

== Awards ==
- Barabashov prize of the National Academy of Sciences of Ukraine (2009)
- State Prize of Ukraine in Science and Technology (2014)
- Basic Science Book Award of the International Academy of Astronautics (2016), for the "Dark energy and dark matter in the Universe : in three volumes" (2013–2015) book series (Vol 2 co-authored by Yakiv and Olena Pavlenko).

== Publications ==
Research papers

- Pavlenko, Ya. V.; Suárez Mascareño, A.; Zapatero Osorio, M. R.; Rebolo, R.; Lodieu, N.; Béjar, V. J. S.; González Hernández, J. I.; Mohorian, M. (2019). "Temporal changes of the flare activity of Proxima Centauri". Astronomy & Astrophysics. 626: A111. arXiv:1905.07347. Bibcode:2019A&A...626A.111P. doi:10.1051/0004-6361/201834258. ISSN 0004-6361.
- Eduardo L Martín, Nicolas Lodieu, Yakiv Pavlenko, Víctor J. S. Béjar (2018). The lithium depletion boundary and the age of the Hyades cluster. The Astrophysical Journal 856 (1): 40 doi:10.3847/1538-4357/aaaeb8
- J. S. Jenkins, L. W. Ramsey, H. R. A. Jones, Y. Pavlenko, J. Gallardo, J. R. Barnes, D. J. Pinfield (2009). Rotational Velocities for M Dwarfs. The Astrophysical Journal 704: 975–988 doi:10.1088/0004-637X/704/2/975
- J. S. Jenkins, H. R. A. Jones, Y. Pavlenko, D. J. Pinfield, J. R. Barnes, Yu. Lyubchik (2008). Metallicities and activities of southern stars. Astronomy & Astrophysics 485: 571–584 doi:10.1051/0004-6361:20078611
- G. J. Harris, J. Tennyson, B. M. Kaminsky, Ya. V. Pavlenko, H. R. A. Jones (2006). Improved HCN/HNC linelist, model atmospheres and synthetic spectra for WZ Cas. Monthly Notices of the Royal Astronomical Society 367: 400–406 doi:10.1111/j.1365-2966.2005.09960.x
- Ya. V. Pavlenko, A. Magazzu (1996). Theoretical LTE and non-LTE curves of growth for LiI lines in G-M dwarfs and subgiants. Astronomy & Astrophysics 311: 961–967
- Y. V. Pavlenko, R. Rebolo, E. L. Martin, R. J. Garcia Lopez (1995). Formation of lithium lines in very cool dwarfs. Astronomy & Astrophysics 303: 807–818

Books

- Novosyadlyj Bohdan, Pelykh Volodymyr, Shtanov Yuri, Zhuk Alexander. Novosyadlyj, B.; Pelykh, V.; Shtanov, Yu.; Zhuk, A. (2013). Shulga, V. (ed.). Dark energy: observational evidence and theoretical models ( volume 1, in three volumes «Dark energy and dark matter in the Universe») (PDF). doi:10.15407/akademperiodyka.240.380. ISBN 978-966-360-240-0.
- Shulga Valery, Zhdanov Valery, Alexandrov Alexander, Berczik Peter, Pavlenko Elena, Pavlenko Yakiv, Pilyugin Leonid, Tsvetkova Viktoria. Shulga, V.M.; Zhdanov, V.І.; Alexandrov, А.N. (2014). Dark matter: Astrophysical aspects of the problem ( volume 2, in three volumes «Dark energy and dark matter in the Universe») (PDF). doi:10.15407/akademperiodyka.253.356. ISBN 978-966-360-253-0.
- Vavilova Irina, Bolotin Yuri, Boyarsky Aleksej, Danevich Fedor, Kobychev Vyacheslav, Tretyak Volodymyr, Babyk Iuri, Iakubovskyi Dmytro, Hnatyk Bohdan, Sergeev Sergej. Vavilova, I.B.; Bolotin, Yu.L.; Boyarsky, A.M.; Danevich, F.A.; Kobychev, V.V.; Tretyak, V.I.; Babyk, Iu.V.; Iakubovskyi, D.A.; Hnatyk, B.I.; Sergeev, S.G. (2015). Shulga, V.M. (ed.). Dark matter: Observational manifestation and experimental searches (volume 3, in three volumes «Dark energy and dark matter in the Universe») (PDF). doi:10.15407/akademperiodyka.287.356. ISBN 978-966-360-287-5.
- The Main Astronomy Observatory of the National Academy of Sciences of Ukraine: From the Idea of the Foundation to the international Recognition (in Ukrainian). Kyiv: Naukova Dumka, 2024. Third ed. (Monography). via MAO NASU
