= Symmetry (journal) =

- Discipline: Natural sciences
- Language: English
- Edited by: Sergei Odintsov

Publication details
- History: 2009–present
- Publisher: MDPI
- Frequency: Monthly
- Open access: Yes
- License: CC BY
- Impact factor: 2.7 (2022)

Standard abbreviations
- ISO 4: Symmetry

Indexing
- CODEN: SYMMAM
- ISSN: 2073-8994
- OCLC no.: 652357646

Links
- Journal homepage

Symmetry is a monthly peer-reviewed open access scientific journal published by MDPI covering several aspects of theories and applications related to symmetry/asymmetry phenomena in the natural sciences. The journal was established in 2009 and the editor-in-chief is Sergei Odintsov (Catalan Institution for Research and Advanced Studies). The journal features occasional special issues on specific selected topics.

== Abstracting and indexing ==
The journal is abstracted and indexed in:

- Chemical Abstracts Service
- Current Contents/Physical, Chemical & Earth Sciences
- EBSCO databases
- Inspec
- MathSciNet (2009–2017)
- Metadex
- ProQuest databases
- Science Citation Index Expanded
- Scopus
- zbMATH Open (2009-2020)

According to the Journal Citation Reports, the journal has a 2022 impact factor of 2.7.

== Awards ==
Since 2018, the journal confers a "young investigator award" in recognition of excellence in the fields of symmetry phenomena in the natural sciences. The award consists of 2000 Swiss francs, an offer to publish a paper free of charge following peer review, and an engraved plaque. The journal also confers various other awards, typically on a yearly basis, and chooses a small number of articles judged to be of particular interest or importance to the field, which are selected as "Editor's Choice".
