= Proxima Centauri b =

Terrestrial planet orbiting the star Proxima Centauri

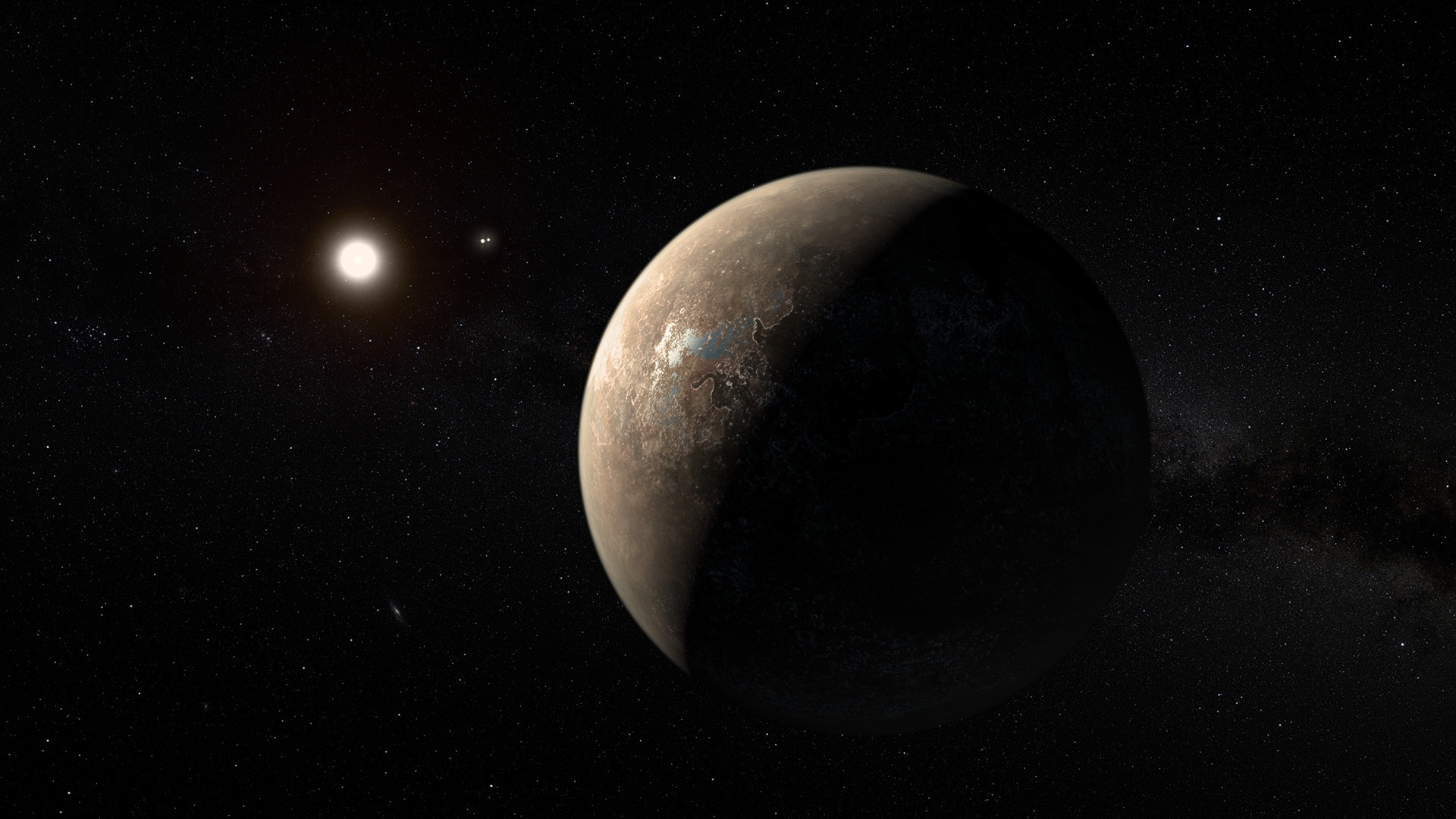
- Artist's conception of Proxima Centauri b as a terrestrial exoplanet, with Proxima Centauri and the Alpha Centauri system visible in the background. The actual appearance and composition of the exoplanet beyond this data is currently unknown.

Discovery
- Discovered by: Anglada-Escudé et al.
- Discovery site: European Southern Observatory
- Discovery date: 24 August 2016
- Detection method: Doppler spectroscopy

Orbital characteristics
- Semi-major axis: 0.04848±0.00029 AU
- Eccentricity: low (Note: The eccentricity is known to be low (<0.1) and is compatible with a circular orbit, which is assumed by the most recent orbital solution.)
- Orbital period (sidereal): 11.18465±0.00053 d
- Semi-amplitude: 1.226±0.062 m/s
- Star: Proxima Centauri

Physical characteristics
- Mean radius: 0.94–1.4 R_{🜨} (Note: Range of possible radius values, depending on Proxima b's composition)
- Mass: ≥1.055±0.055 M_{🜨}
- Temperature: T_{eq}: 234 K (−39 °C; −38 °F)

Proxima Centauri b, also referred to as Proxima b, or Alpha Centauri Cb, is an exoplanet orbiting within the habitable zone of the red dwarf star Proxima Centauri in the constellation Centaurus. The host star is the closest star to the Sun, at a distance of about 4.2 light-years (1.3 parsecs) from Earth, and is part of the larger triple star system Alpha Centauri. Proxima b and Proxima d, along with the currently disputed Proxima c, are the closest known exoplanets to the Solar System.

Proxima Centauri b orbits its parent star at a distance of about 0.04848 AU (7.253 million km; 4.506 million mi) with an orbital period of approximately 11.2 Earth days. Its other properties are only poorly understood, but it is probably a terrestrial planet with a minimum mass of 1.06 M_{🜨} and a slightly larger radius than that of Earth. The planet orbits within the habitable zone of its parent star; but it is not known whether it has an atmosphere, which would impact the habitability probabilities. Proxima Centauri is a flare star with intense emission of electromagnetic radiation that could strip an atmosphere off the planet.

Announced on 24 August 2016 by the European Southern Observatory (ESO), Proxima Centauri b was confirmed via several years of Doppler spectroscopy measurements of its parent star. The detection of Proxima Centauri b was a major discovery in planetology, and has drawn interest to the Alpha Centauri star system as a whole. As of 2023, Proxima Centauri b is believed to be the best-known exoplanet to the general public. The exoplanet's proximity to Earth offers an opportunity for robotic space exploration.

== Discovery ==
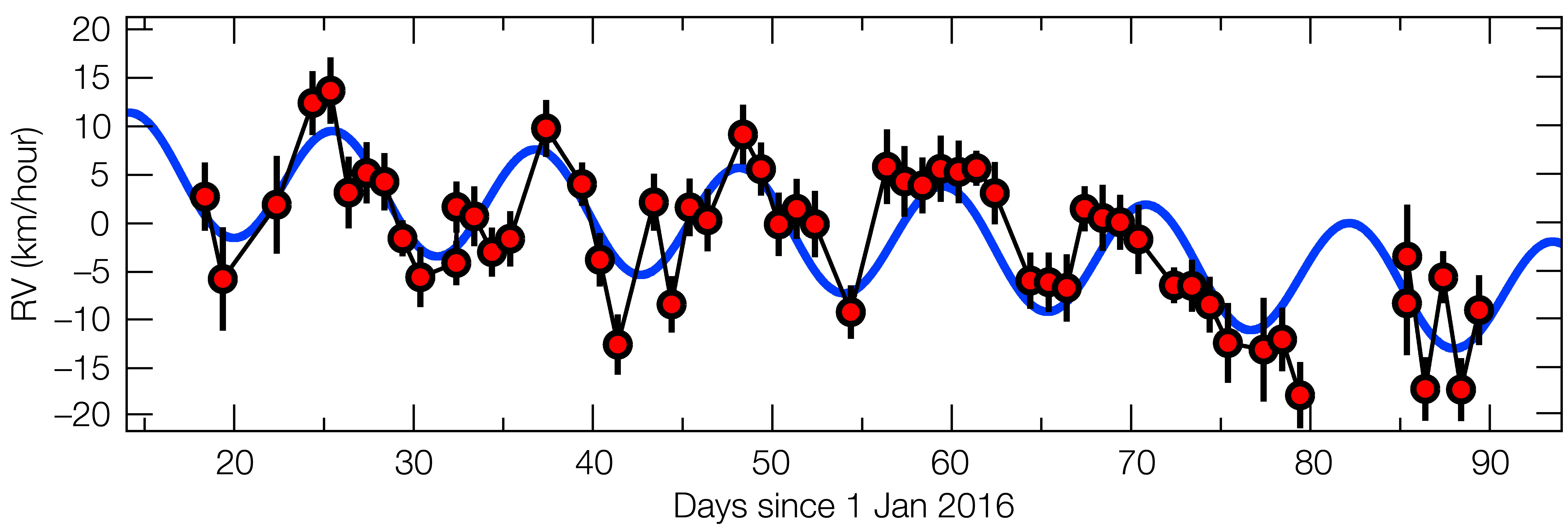
Velocity of Proxima Centauri towards and away from the Earth as measured with the HARPS spectrograph during the first three months of 2016. The red symbols with black error bars represent data points, and the blue curve is a fit of the data. The amplitude and period of the motion were used to estimate the planet's minimum mass.

Proxima Centauri had become a target for exoplanet searches before the discovery of Proxima Centauri b, but initial studies in 2008 and 2009 ruled out the existence of larger-than-Earth exoplanets in the habitable zone. Planets are common around dwarf stars, with on average 1–2 planets per star, and about 20–40% of all red dwarfs have one in the habitable zone. Additionally, red dwarfs are by far the most common type of stars.

Based on observations with instruments (Note: The Ultraviolet and Visual Echelle Spectrograph and the High Accuracy Radial Velocity Planet Searcher.) at the European Southern Observatory in Chile prior to 2016, motion anomalies were identified in Proxima Centauri that could not be satisfactorily explained by flares (Note: Flares are presumably magnetic phenomena during which for minutes and hours parts of the star emit more radiation than usual.) or chromospheric (Note: The chromosphere is an outer layer of a star.) activity of the star. This suggested that Proxima Centauri may be orbited by an exoplanet. In January 2016, a team of astronomers launched the Pale Red Dot project to confirm this hypothetical exoplanet's existence. On 24 August 2016, the team led by Anglada-Escudé proposed that a terrestrial exoplanet in the habitable zone of Proxima Centauri could explain these anomalies and announced Proxima Centauri b's discovery.

In 2022, the exoplanet Proxima Centauri d, which orbits even closer to the star, was confirmed. An exoplanet candidate named Proxima Centauri c was reported in 2020, but its existence has since been disputed due to potential artifacts in the data. The claimed existence of a dust belt around Proxima Centauri remains unconfirmed.

== Physical properties ==
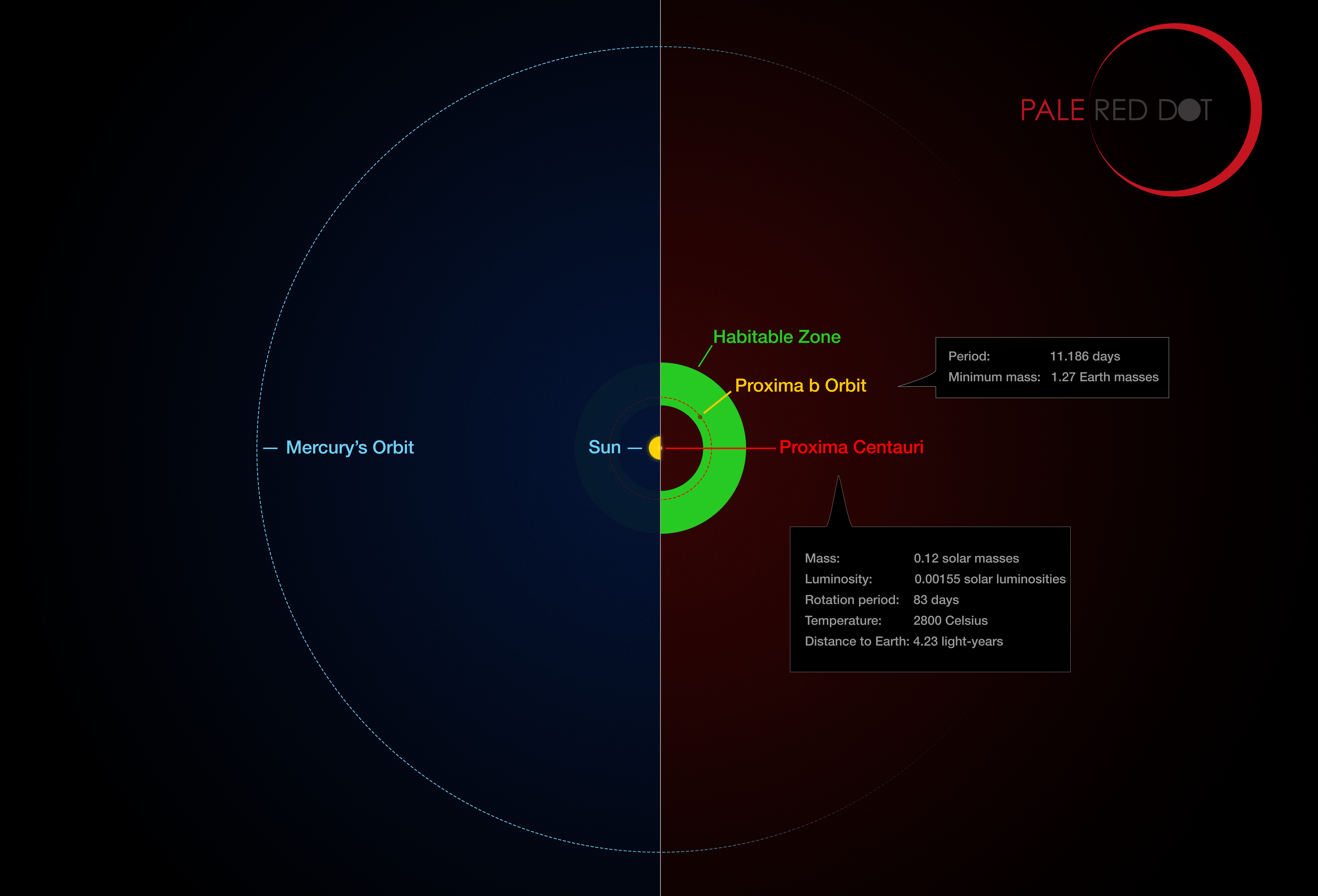
Overview and comparison of the orbital distance of the habitable zones of Proxima Centauri compared to the Solar System

=== Distance, orbital parameters and age ===
Proxima Centauri b is the closest exoplanet to Earth, at a distance of about 4.2 ly (1.3 parsecs). It orbits Proxima Centauri every 11.185 Earth days at a distance of about 0.048 AU, over 20 times closer to Proxima Centauri than Earth is to the Sun. As of 2021, it is unclear whether it has a significant eccentricity (Note: Proxima Centauri b's eccentricity is constrained to be less than 0.35 and later observations have indicated eccentricities of 0.08+0.07 −0.06, 0.17+0.21 −0.12 and 0.105+0.091 −0.068) but Proxima Centauri b is unlikely to have any obliquity. The age of the planet is unknown; Proxima Centauri has been assumed to be about 5 billion years old based on age estimates of Alpha Centauri, but some studies suggest an age of 7–8 billion years, which would be possible if Proxima was captured by the Alpha Centauri pair. Recent estimates suggest an age of 7–8 billion years for Alpha Centauri itself. Proxima Centauri b is unlikely to have stable orbits for moons.

=== Mass, radius and composition ===
As of 2025, the estimated minimum mass of Proxima Centauri b is 1.055±0.055 M_{🜨}; other estimates are similar, but all estimates are a minimum because the inclination of the planet's orbit is not yet known. Assuming an inclination of 47°, coplanar with its host star's rotation, its true mass would be 1.44±0.21 M_{🜨}. This makes it similar to Earth, but the radius of the planet is poorly known and hard to determine—estimates based on possible composition give a range of 0.94 to 1.4 R_{🜨}, and its mass may border on the cutoff between Earth-type and Neptune-type planets, if that value is lower than previously estimated. Depending on the composition, Proxima Centauri b could range from being a Mercury-like planet with a large core—which would require particular conditions early in the planet's history—to a very water-rich planet. Observations of the Fe–Si–Mg ratios of Proxima Centauri may allow a determination of the composition of the planet, since they are expected to roughly match the ratios of any planetary bodies in the Proxima Centauri system; various observations have found Solar System-like ratios of these elements.

Little is known about Proxima Centauri b as of 2021—mainly its distance from the star and its orbital period—but a number of simulations of its physical properties have been done. A number of simulations and models have been created that assume Earth-like compositions and include predictions of the galactic environment, internal heat generation from radioactive decay and magnetic induction heating, (Note: Tides may result in internal heating in Proxima Centauri b; depending on the eccentricity Io-like values with intense volcanic activity or Earth-like values could be reached. The magnetic field of the star can also induce intense heating of the planet's interior, especially early in its history.) planetary rotation, the effects of stellar radiation, the amount of volatile elements the planet consists of and the changes of these parameters over time.

Proxima Centauri b likely developed under different conditions from Earth, with less water, stronger impacts and an overall faster development, assuming that it formed at its current distance from the star. Proxima Centauri b probably did not form at its current distance to Proxima Centauri, as the amount of material in the protoplanetary disk would be insufficient. Instead, the planet, or protoplanetary fragments, likely formed at larger distances and then migrated to the current orbit of Proxima Centauri b. Depending on the nature of the precursor material, it may be rich in volatiles. A number of different formation scenarios are possible, many of which depend on the existence of other planets around Proxima Centauri and which would result in different compositions.

=== Tidal locking ===
Proxima Centauri b is likely to be tidally locked to the host star, which for a 1:1 orbit would mean that the same side of the planet would always face Proxima Centauri. It is unclear whether habitable conditions can arise under such circumstances as a 1:1 tidal lock would lead to an extreme climate with only part of the planet habitable.

However, the planet may not be tidally locked. If the eccentricity of Proxima Centauri b was higher than 0.1–0.06, it would tend to enter a Mercury-like 3:2 resonance (Note: A 3:2 ratio of the planet's rotation and its orbit around the star.) or higher-order resonances such as 2:1. Additional planets around Proxima Centauri and interactions (Note: The tides excited by Alpha Centauri could have induced an eccentricity of 0.1.) with Alpha Centauri could excite higher eccentricities. If the planet is not symmetrical (triaxial), a capture into a non-tidally locked orbit would be possible even with low eccentricity. A non-locked orbit, however, would result in tidal heating of the planet's mantle, increasing volcanic activity and potentially shutting down a magnetic field-generating dynamo. The exact dynamics are strongly dependent on the internal structure of the planet and its evolution in response to tidal heating. A non-locked planet may experience ocean tides much more intense than Earth.

=== Magnetosphere ===
In May 2026, a study of Proxima Centauri found evidence of star-planet magnetic interaction for both Proxima Centauri d and Proxima Centauri b, implying the likely presence of magnetic fields on both planets. Similar star-planet interaction was previously observed at YZ Ceti b.

== Host star ==
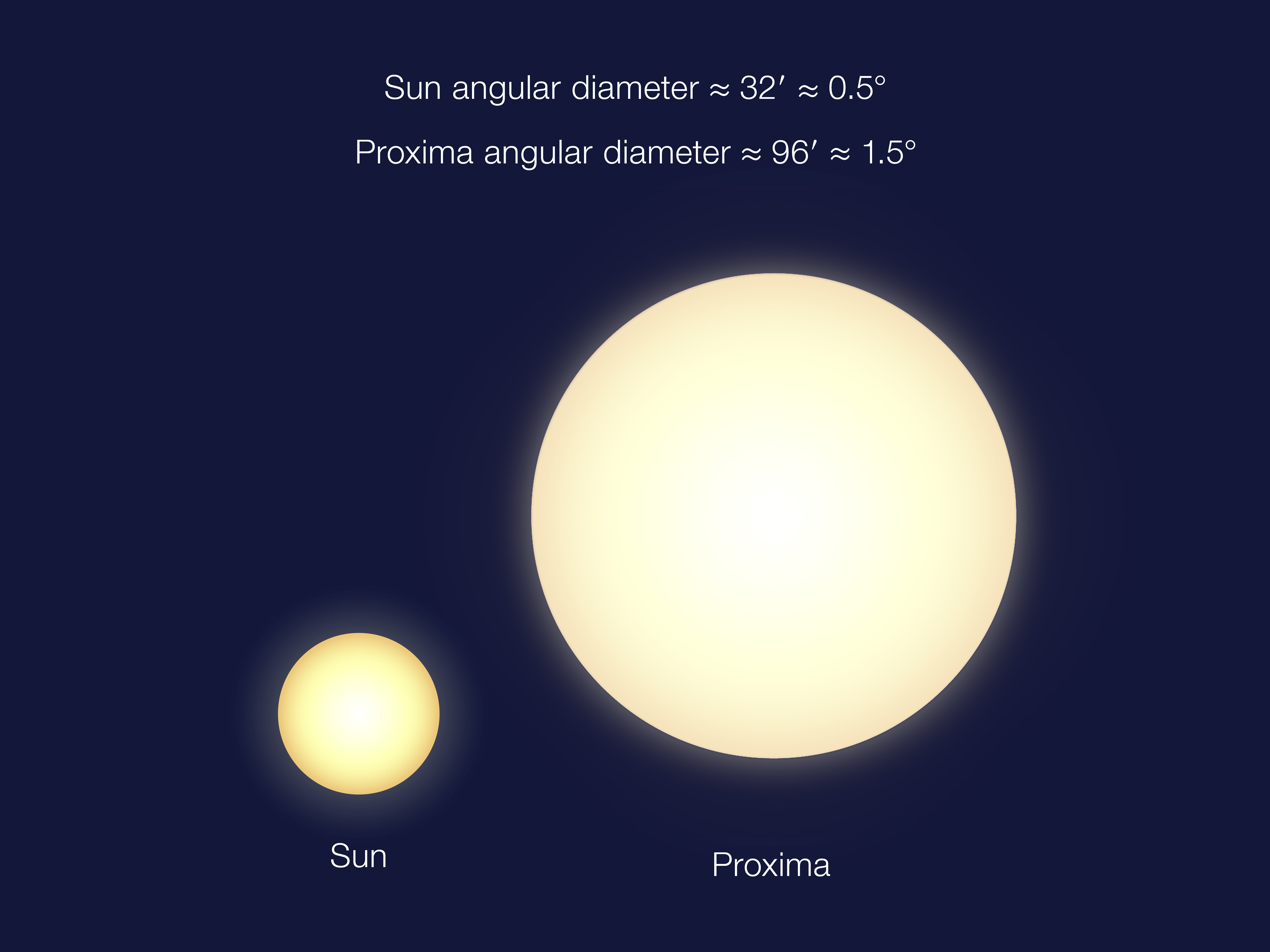
An angular size comparison of how Proxima will appear in the sky seen from Proxima b (96'), compared with how the Sun appears in our sky on Earth (32'). Proxima is much smaller than the Sun, but Proxima b is very close to its star.

Proxima Centauri b's parent star Proxima Centauri is a red dwarf, radiating only 0.005% of the amount of visible light than that of the Sun and an average of about 0.17% of the Sun's energy. Despite this low radiation, due to its close orbit Proxima Centauri b receives about 70% of the amount of infrared energy that the Earth receives from the Sun. Proxima Centauri is also a flare star with its luminosity at times varying by a factor of 100 over a timespan of hours; its luminosity averaged at 0.155±0.006 L_{☉}.

Proxima Centauri has 12.2% of the Sun's mass and 15.4% of the radius of the Sun. With an effective temperature (Note: The effective temperature is the temperature a black body that emits the same amount of radiation would have.) of 3,050±100 Kelvin, it has a spectral type (Note: A spectral type is a scheme to categorize stars by their temperature.) of M5.5V, making it an M-type main-sequence star that is fusing hydrogen at its core to generate energy. The magnetic field of Proxima Centauri is considerably stronger than that of the Sun, with an intensity of 600±150 G; it varies in a seven-year-long cycle.

It is the closest star to the Sun, hence the name "Proxima", with a distance of 4.2426 ± 0.0020 light-years (1.3008 ± 0.0006 pc). Proxima Centauri is part of a multiple star system, whose other members are Alpha Centauri A and Alpha Centauri B which form a binary star subsystem. The dynamics of the multiple star system could have caused Proxima Centauri b to move closer to its host star over its history. The detection of a planet around Alpha Centauri B in 2012 was considered questionable. Despite its proximity to Earth, Proxima Centauri is too faint to be visible to the naked eye, except during superflares.

== Surface conditions ==
=== Climate ===
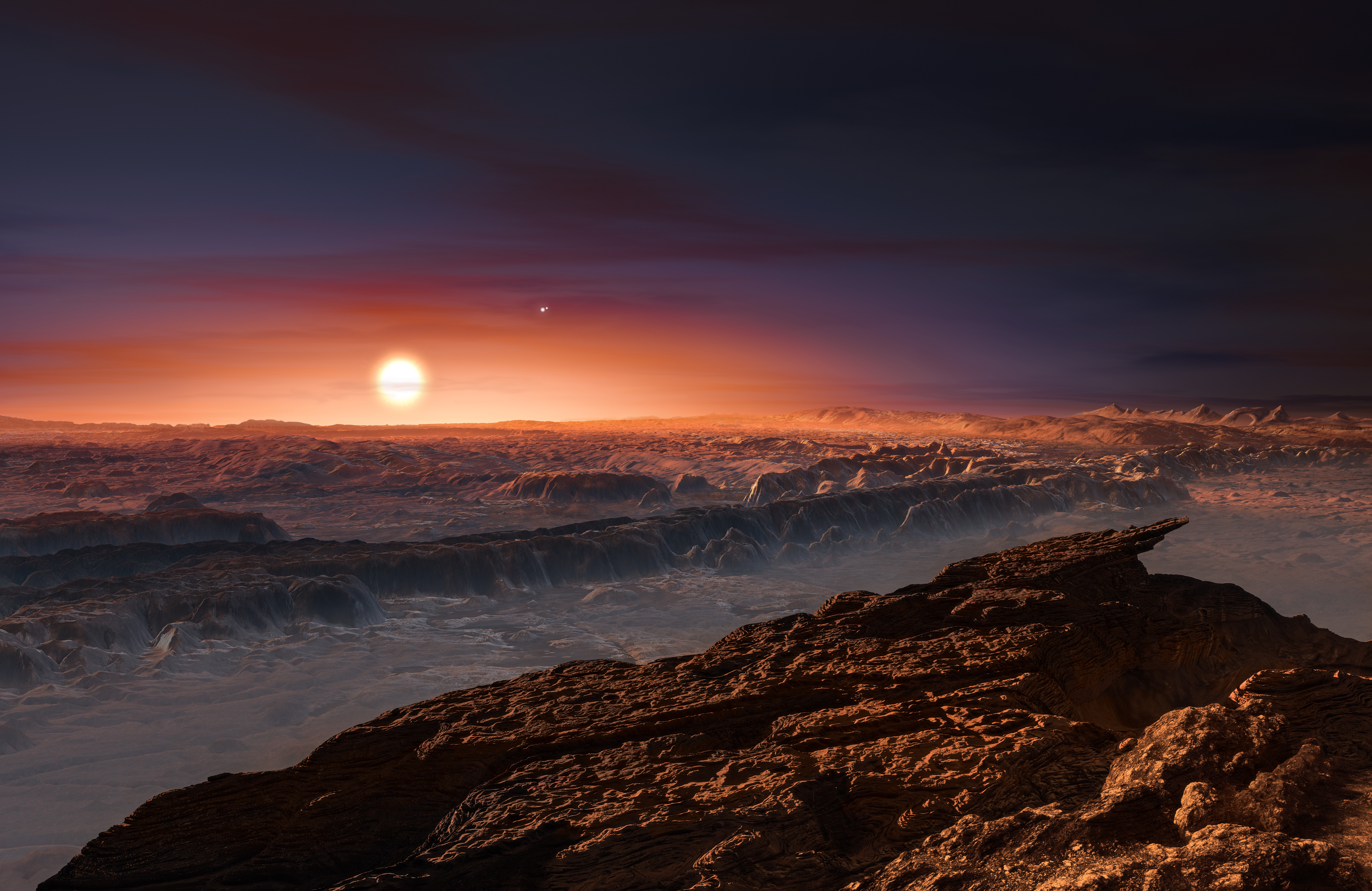
Artist's conception of the surface of Proxima Centauri b. The Alpha Centauri AB binary system can be seen in the distance, to the upper right of Proxima, as two white dots.

Proxima Centauri b is located within the classical habitable zone of its star and receives about 65% of Earth's irradiation. Its equilibrium temperature is estimated to be about 234 K (−39 °C; −38 °F). Various factors, such as the orbital properties of Proxima Centauri b, the spectrum of radiation emitted by Proxima Centauri (Note: The radiation of a red dwarf is much less effectively reflected by snow, ice and clouds although—in the case of ice—the formation of salt-bearing ice (hydrohalite) could offset this effect. It also does not as readily degrade trace gases like methane, dinitrogen monoxide and methyl chloride as the Sun's.) and the behaviour of clouds (Note: For example, cloud accumulation below the star in the case of a tidally locked planet stabilizes the climate by increasing the reflection of starlight.) and hazes influence the climate of an atmosphere-bearing Proxima Centauri b.

There are two likely scenarios for an atmosphere of Proxima Centauri b: in one case, the planet's water could have condensed and the hydrogen would have been lost to space, which would have only left oxygen and/or carbon dioxide in the atmosphere after the planet's early history. However, it is also possible that Proxima Centauri b had a primordial hydrogen atmosphere or formed farther away from its star, which would have reduced the escape of water. Thus, Proxima Centauri b may have kept its water beyond its early history. If an atmosphere exists, it is likely to contain oxygen-bearing gases such as oxygen and carbon dioxide. Together with the star's magnetic activity, they would give rise to auroras that could be observed from Earth if the planet has a magnetic field (as implied by a 2026 study).

Climate models including general circulation models used for Earth’s climate have been used to simulate the properties of Proxima Centauri b's atmosphere. Depending on its properties such as whether it is tidally locked, the amount of water and carbon dioxide a number of scenarios are possible: A planet partially or wholly covered with ice, planet-wide or small oceans or only dry land, combinations between these, scenarios with one or two "eyeballs" (Note: One or multiple areas of liquid water surrounded by ice.) or lobster-shaped areas with liquid water (meaning near the equator, with two nearly identical areas on each hemisphere, sprouting from the equator like lobster claws), or a subsurface ocean with a thin (less than a kilometre) ice cover that may be slushy in some places. Additional factors are:

- The nature of convection.
- The distribution of continents, which can sustain a carbonate-silicate cycle and thus stabilize the atmospheric carbon dioxide concentrations.
- The effects of galactic cosmic rays, which are expected to be more significant around Proxima Centauri b than around Earth.
- Ocean heat transport which broadens the space for habitable climates.
- Ocean salinity variations that alter the properties of an ocean.
- Ozone chemistry, which can increase the stratospheric temperature and influence surface temperatures.
- The rotational period of the planet which determines Rossby wave dynamics.
- Internal heat flow which can melt the bases of ice sheets.
- Sea ice dynamics which could cause a global ocean to freeze over.

=== Stability of an atmosphere ===
The stability of an atmosphere is a major issue for the habitability of Proxima Centauri b, as a result of several currently unknown factors:

- Strong irradiation by UV radiation and X-rays from Proxima Centauri constitutes a challenge to habitability. Proxima Centauri b receives about 10–60 times as much of this radiation especially X-rays, as Earth. It might have received even more in the past, adding up to 7–16 times as much cumulative XUV radiation than Earth. UV radiation and X-rays can effectively evaporate an atmosphere since hydrogen readily absorbs the radiation and does not readily lose it again, thus warming until the speed of hydrogen atoms and molecules is sufficient to escape from the gravitational field of a planet. They can remove water by splitting it into hydrogen and oxygen and heating the hydrogen in the planet's exosphere until it escapes. The hydrogen can drag other elements such as oxygen and nitrogen away. Nitrogen and carbon dioxide can escape on their own from an atmosphere but this process is unlikely to substantially reduce the nitrogen and carbon dioxide content of an Earth-like planet.
- Stellar winds and coronal mass ejections are an even bigger threat to an atmosphere. The amount of stellar wind impacting Proxima Centauri b may amount to 4–80 times that impacting Earth, with a pressure about ten thousand times larger than the Sun's stellar wind. The more intense UV and X-ray radiation could lift the planet's atmosphere to outside of the magnetic field, increasing the loss triggered by stellar wind and mass ejections. A planet like Proxima Centauri b might develop an internal structure that precludes the existence of strong planetary magnetic fields.
- At Proxima Centauri b's distance from the star, the stellar wind is likely to be more dense than around Earth by a factor of 10–1,000 depending on the strength and stage (Proxima Centauri has a seven-year-long magnetic cycle) of Proxima Centauri's magnetic field. As of 2018 it is unknown whether the planet has a magnetic field and the upper atmosphere may have its own magnetic field. Depending on the intensity of Proxima Centauri b's magnetic field, the stellar wind can penetrate deep into the atmosphere of the planet and strip off parts of it, with substantial variability over daily and annual timescales.
- If the planet is tidally locked to the star, the atmosphere can collapse on the night side. This is particularly a risk for a carbon dioxide-dominated atmosphere although carbon dioxide glaciers could recycle.
- Unlike Sun-like stars, Proxima Centauri's habitable zone would have been farther away early in the system's existence when the star was in its pre-main sequence (Note: Red dwarfs like Proxima Centauri are brighter before they enter the main sequence of stars.) stage. In the case of Proxima Centauri, assuming that the planet formed in its current orbit, it could have spent up to 180 million years too close to its star for water to condense. Proxima Centauri b may therefore have suffered a runaway greenhouse effect, in which the planet's water would have evaporated into steam, which would then have been split into hydrogen and oxygen by UV radiation. The hydrogen and thus any water would have subsequently been lost, similar to what is believed to have happened to Venus.
- While the characteristics of impact events on Proxima Centauri b are currently entirely conjectural, they could destabilize the atmospheres and boil off oceans.
- An ice-covered Proxima Centauri b with a subsurface ocean is expected to have cryovolcanic activity at rates comparable to volcanism on Jupiter's moon Io. The cryovolcanism would generate a thin exosphere comparable to that of Jupiter's moon Europa.

Even if Proxima Centauri b lost its original atmosphere, volcanic activity could rebuild it after some time. A second atmosphere would likely contain carbon dioxide, which would make it more stable than an Earth-like atmosphere, particularly in the presence of an ocean, which, depending on its size, as well as the atmospheric mass and composition, may contribute to preventing atmospheric collapse. Additionally, impacts of exocomets could resupply water to Proxima Centauri b, if they are present.

=== Delivery of water to Proxima Centauri b ===
A number of mechanisms can deliver water to a developing planet; how much water Proxima Centauri b received is unknown. Modelling by Ribas et al. 2016 indicates that Proxima Centauri b would have lost no more than one Earth ocean's equivalent of water but later research suggested that the amount of water lost could be considerably larger and Airapetian et al. 2017 concluded that an atmosphere would be lost within ten million years. The estimates are strongly dependent on the initial mass of the atmosphere, however, and are thus highly uncertain.

== Possibility of life ==
In the context of exoplanet research, "habitability" is usually defined as the possibility that liquid water exists on the surface of a planet. As normally understood in the context of exoplanet life, liquid water on the surface and an atmosphere are prerequisites for habitability—any life limited to the subsurface of a planet, such as in a subsurface ocean, like those that reside in Europa in the Solar System, would be difficult to detect from afar although it may constitute a model for life in a cold ocean-covered Proxima Centauri b.

=== Setbacks to habitability ===
The habitability of red dwarfs is a controversial subject, with a number of considerations for Proxima b:

- Both the activity of Proxima Centauri and tidal locking would hinder the establishment of these conditions on the planet.
- Unlike XUV radiation, UV radiation on Proxima Centauri b is redder (colder) and thus may interact less with organic compounds and may produce less ozone. Conversely, stellar activity could deplete an ozone layer sufficiently to increase UV radiation to dangerous levels.
- Depending on its eccentricity, it may partially lie outside of the habitable zone during part of its orbit.
- Oxygen and/or carbon monoxide may build up in the atmosphere of Proxima Centauri b to toxic quantities. High oxygen concentrations may, however, aid in the evolution of complex organisms.
- If oceans are present, the tides could lead to the flooding and drying of coastal landscapes, triggering chemical reactions conducive to the development of life, favour the evolution of biological rhythms such as the day-night cycle which otherwise would not develop in a tidally locked planet without a day-night cycle, mix oceans and supply and redistribute nutrients and stimulate periodic expansions of marine organisms such as red tides on Earth. Very strong tides however could give rise to extreme erosion of continents and to intense tidal heating, impairing habitability.

On the other hand, red dwarfs like Proxima Centauri have a lifespan much longer than the Sun, exceeding the estimated age of the Universe, and thus give life time to develop. The radiation emitted by Proxima Centauri is ill-suited for oxygen-generating photosynthesis but sufficient for anoxygenic photosynthesis although it is unclear how life depending on anoxygenic photosynthesis could be detected. One study in 2017 estimated that the productivity of a Proxima Centauri b ecosystem based on photosynthesis may be about 20% that of Earth's.

== Observation and exploration ==
As of 2021, Proxima Centauri b has not yet been directly imaged, as its separation from Proxima Centauri is too small. It is unlikely to transit Proxima Centauri from Earth's perspective; (Note: The probability is about 1.5%.) all surveys have failed to find transits of Proxima Centauri b. The star is monitored for the possible emission of technology-related radio signals by the Breakthrough Listen project which in April–May 2019 detected the BLC1 signal; later investigations, however, indicated it is probably of human origin.

Large ground-based telescopes and space-based observatories such as the James Webb Space Telescope and the Nancy Grace Roman Space Telescope could directly observe Proxima Centauri b, given its proximity to Earth, but disentangling the planet from its star would be difficult. Possible traits observable from Earth are the reflection of starlight from an ocean, the radiative patterns of atmospheric gases and hazes and of atmospheric heat transport. (Note: If there is an atmosphere or ocean and Proxima Centauri b is tidally locked, an atmosphere or an ocean would tend to redistribute heat from the day side to the night side and this would be visible from Earth.) Efforts have been made to determine what Proxima Centauri b would look like to Earth if it has particular properties such as atmospheres of a particular composition.

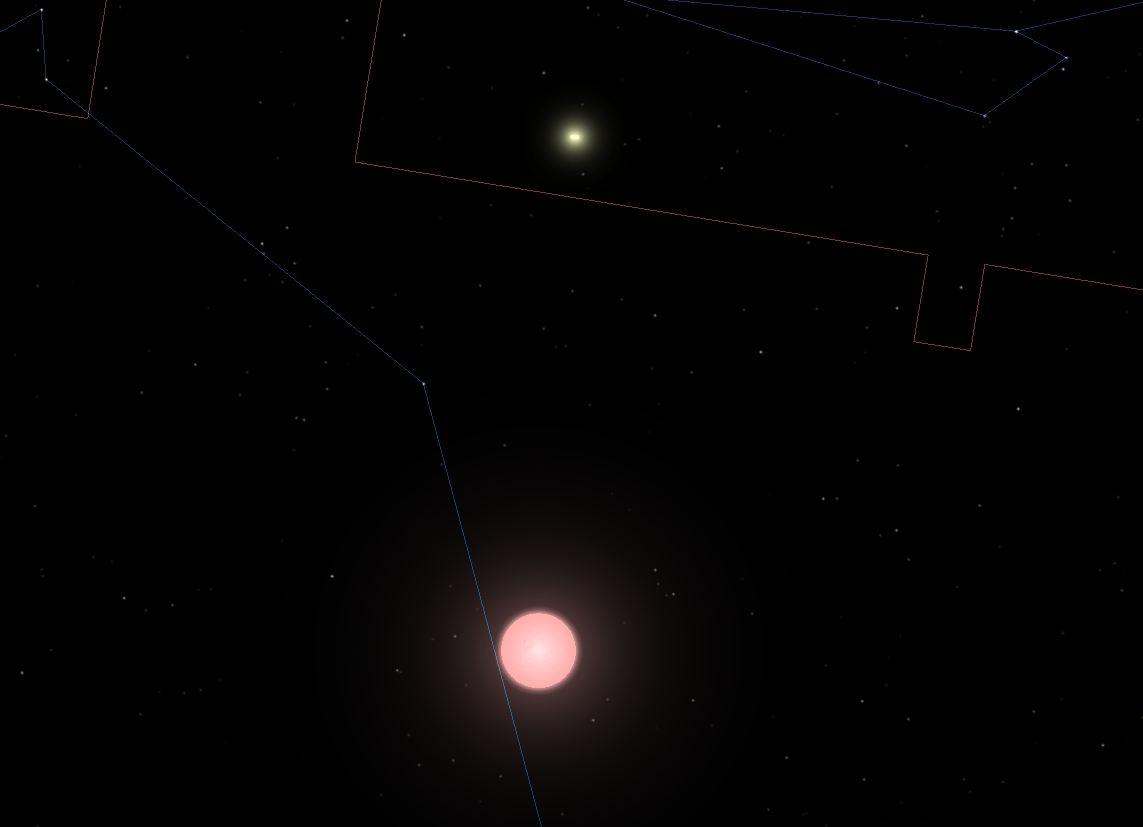
View from Proxima Centauri b of Proxima Centauri, with Alpha Centauri A and B in the background. Generated with Celestia.

Even the fastest spacecraft built by humans would take a long time to travel interstellar distances; Voyager 2 would take about 75,000 years to reach Proxima Centauri. Among the proposed technologies to reach Proxima Centauri b in human lifespans are solar sails that could reach speeds of 20% the speed of light; problems would be how to decelerate a probe when it arrives in the Proxima Centauri system and collisions of the high-speed probes with interstellar particles. Among the projects of travelling to Proxima Centauri b was the Breakthrough Starshot project, which aims to develop instruments and power systems that can reach Proxima Centauri in the 21st century.

== View from Proxima Centauri b ==
From the surface of Proxima Centauri b, the two components of Alpha Centauri would each be brighter than the maximum brightness of Venus seen from Earth, with apparent magnitudes of −6.8 and −5.2. The Sun would appear as a bright star with an apparent magnitude of 0.40 in the constellation of Cassiopeia. The brightness of the Sun would be similar to that of Achernar or Procyon from Earth. (Note: The coordinates of the Sun would be diametrically opposite Proxima Centauri, at α=02^{h} 29^{m} 42.9487^{s}, δ=+62° 40′ 46.141″. The absolute magnitude M_{v} of the Sun is 4.83, so at a parallax π of 0.77199 the apparent magnitude m is given by 4.83 − 5(log_{10}(0.77199) + 1) = 0.40.)

== View from Earth ==
Looking towards the sky around Orion from Alpha Centauri with Sirius near Betelgeuse, Procyon in Gemini, and the Sun between Perseus and Cassiopeia generated by Celestia

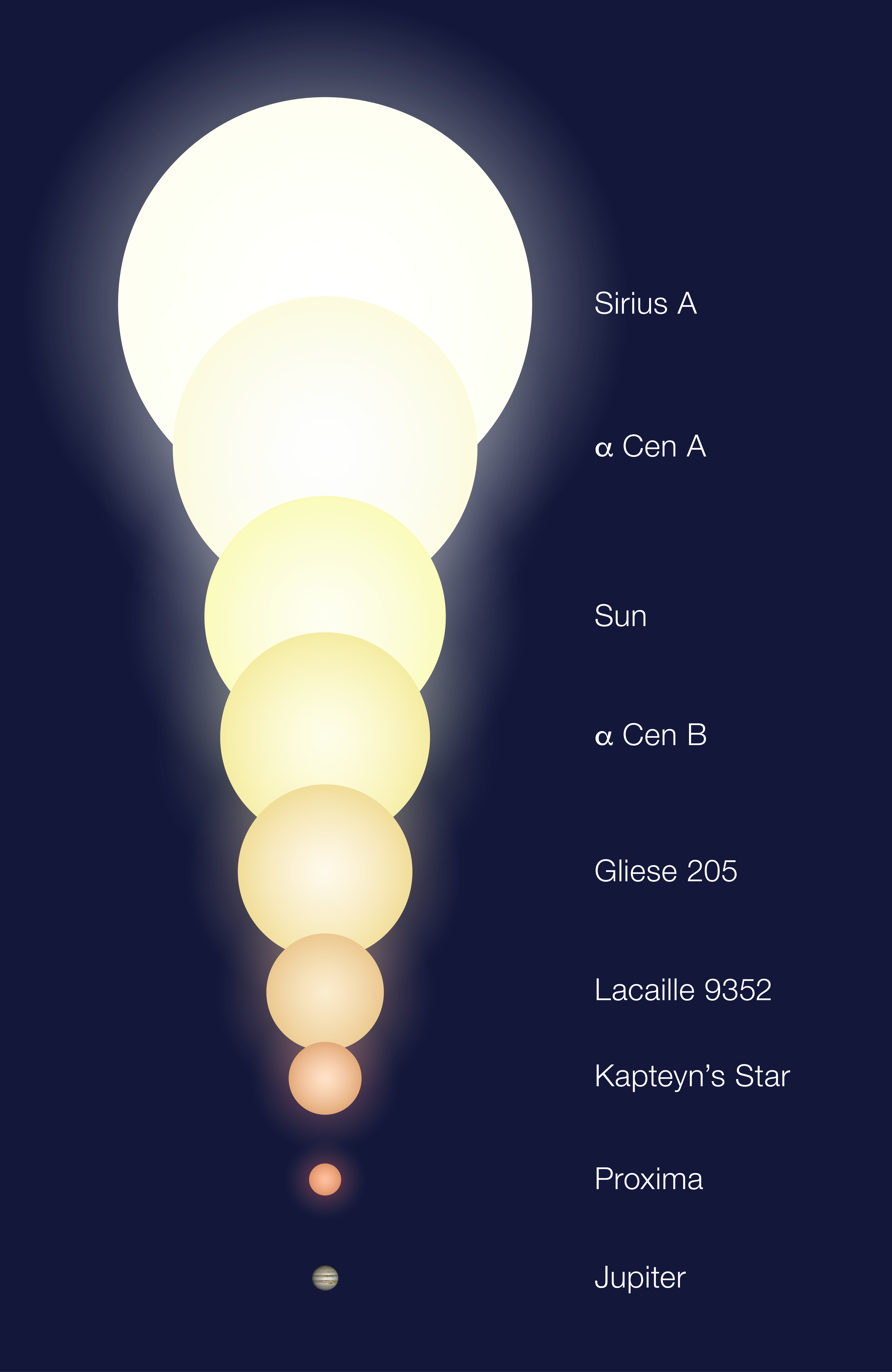
The relative sizes of a number of objects, including the three stars of the Alpha Centauri triple system and some other stars for which the angular sizes have also been measured. The Sun and Jupiter are also shown for comparison.

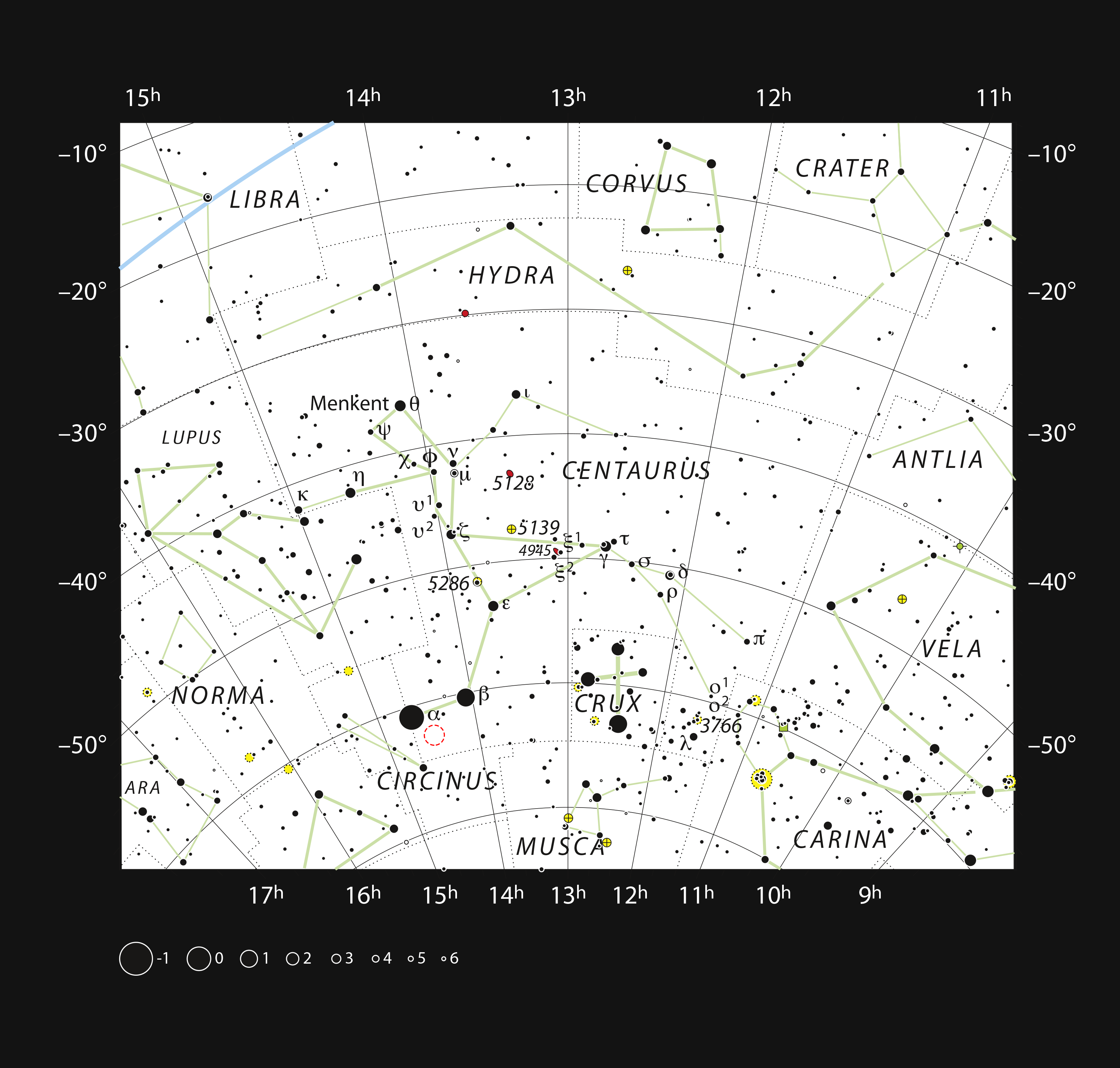
This chart shows the large southern constellation of Centaurus (the Centaur) and shows most of the stars visible with the naked eye on a clear dark night. The location of the closest star to the Solar System, Proxima Centauri, is marked with a red circle. Proxima Centauri is too faint to see with the unaided eye but can be found using a small telescope.

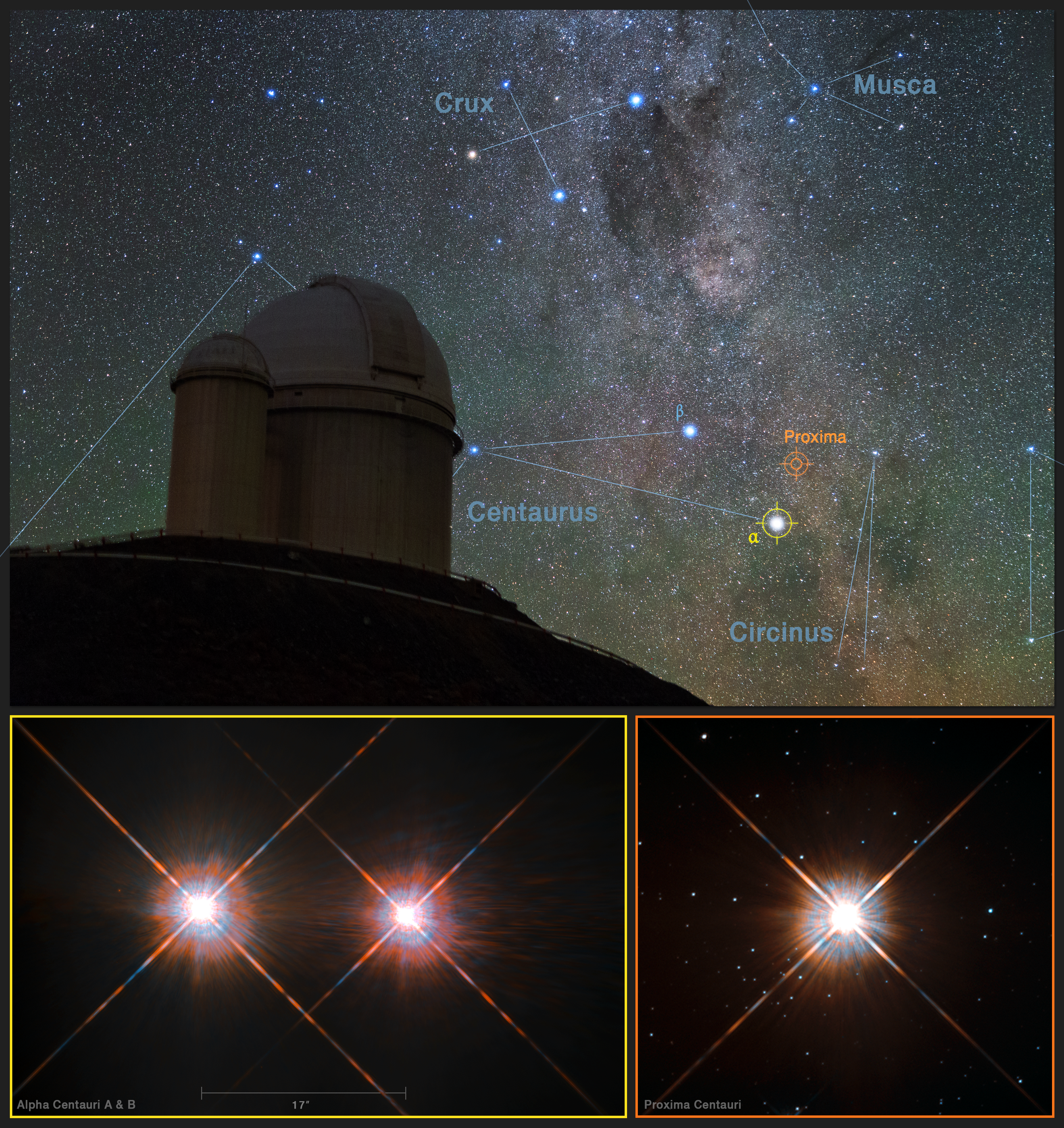
This picture combines a view of the southern skies over the ESO 3.6-metre telescope at the La Silla Observatory in Chile with images of the stars Proxima Centauri (lower-right) and the double star Alpha Centauri AB (lower-left) from the NASA/ESA Hubble Space Telescope. Proxima Centauri is the closest star to the Solar System and is orbited by the planet Proxima b.

== Videos ==
A numerical simulation of possible surface temperatures on Proxima b performed with the Laboratoire de Météorologie Dynamique's Planetary Global Climate Model. Here it is hypothesized that the planet possesses an Earth-like atmosphere and that it is covered by an ocean (the dashed line is the frontier between the liquid and icy oceanic surface). Two models were produced for the planet's rotation. Here the planet is in a so-called 3:2 resonance (a natural frequency for the orbit), and is seen as a distant observer would do during one full orbit.

A numerical simulation of possible surface temperatures. Here it is hypothesized that the planet possesses an Earth-like atmosphere and that it is covered by an ocean (the dashed line is the frontier between the liquid and icy oceanic surface). Here the planet is in synchronous rotation (like the Moon around the Earth), and is seen as a distant observer would do during one full orbit.

== See also ==
- Alpha Centauri Bb – exoplanet once proposed to be orbiting the secondary star of the system, Alpha Centauri B, and was dubbed the closest exoplanet for a while before being disproven
- Alpha Centauri Ab – unconfirmed exoplanet potentially orbiting the primary star of the system
- Astrobiology
- Extremely large telescope
- Exoplanet orbital and physical parameters
- List of potentially habitable exoplanets
