= Proxima Centauri d =

Sub-Earth orbiting Proxima Centauri

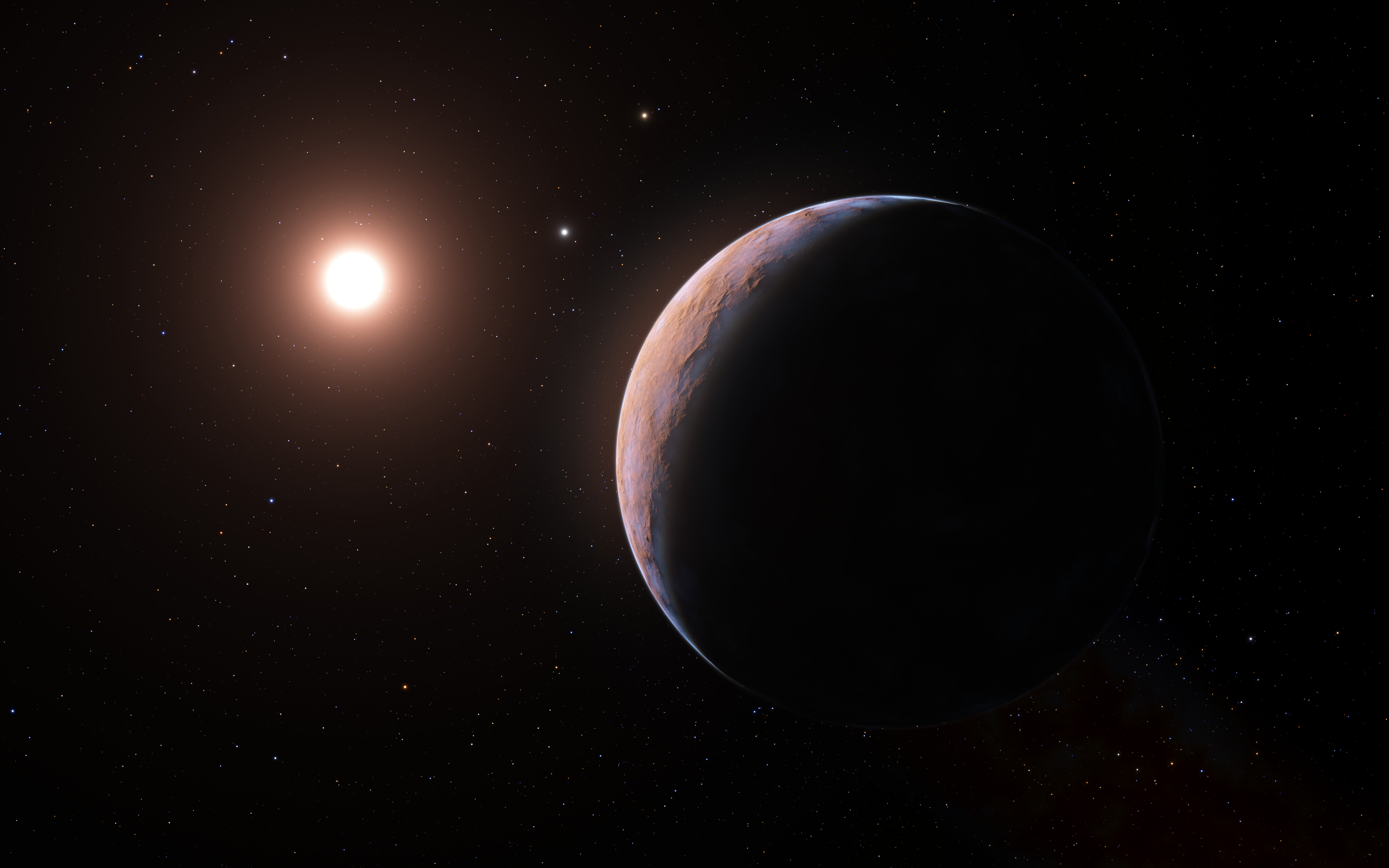
- Artistic depiction of Proxima Centauri d, with Proxima Centauri and Alpha Centauri A & B visible in the background

Discovery
- Discovered by: J. P. Faria, et al.
- Discovery site: VLT-ESPRESSO
- Discovery date: 10 February 2022; 29 July 2025 (confirmed)
- Detection method: Radial velocity

Orbital characteristics
- Semi-major axis: 0.02881±0.00017 AU
- Eccentricity: low (Note: The eccentricity is known to be low (<0.25) and is compatible with a circular orbit, which is assumed by the most recent orbital solution.)
- Orbital period (sidereal): 5.12338±0.00035 d
- Semi-amplitude: 0.392±0.057 m/s
- Star: Proxima Centauri

Physical characteristics
- Mean radius: ~0.81±0.08 R_{🜨} (predicted)
- Mass: ≥0.260±0.038 M_{🜨}
- Temperature: 360 K (87 °C; 188 °F)

Proxima Centauri d (also called Proxima d) is a confirmed exoplanet orbiting the red dwarf star Proxima Centauri, the closest star to the Sun and part of the Alpha Centauri triple star system. Together with one or two other planets (Note: Proxima Centauri c's radial velocity signature was disputed in a 2022 study, which instead attributed its detection to potential bias in data processing methods, thereby leaving its existence disputed.) in the Proxima Centauri system, it is the closest known exoplanet to the Solar System, located approximately 4.2 light-years (1.3 parsecs; 40 trillion kilometres; 25 trillion miles) away in the constellation of Centaurus. The first signs of the exoplanet emerged as a weak 5.15-day signal in radial velocity data taken from the Very Large Telescope during a 2020 study on Proxima b's mass. This signal was formally proposed to be a candidate exoplanet by Faria et al. in a follow-up paper published in February 2022, and was independently confirmed in 2025.

== Characteristics ==
Proxima d is a sub-Earth at least one-quarter of the mass of Earth (or twice the mass of Mars), orbiting at roughly 0.029 AU (4.3 million km; 2.7 million mi) every 5.1 days. It is the least massive and innermost known planet of the Proxima Centauri system. It was the least massive exoplanet detected with the radial velocity method from 2022 until the discovery of Barnard's Star e in 2025. Its proximity to the star and short orbital period of 5.1 days suggest that it is likely tidally locked due to strong tidal forces. Although Proxima d orbits too close to its star to have a habitable equilibrium temperature (which likely reaches 360 K (87 °C; 188 °F) from about 190% of Earth's irradiation—assuming an Earth-like reflectivity, it is theoretically possible that Proxima d possesses polar regions with habitable temperatures.

Since Proxima d has only been detected by the radial velocity method, only a minimum mass is known; the true mass depends on the orbital inclination. Assuming an inclination of 47°, coplanar with its host star's rotation, its true mass would be 0.357±0.072 M_{🜨}.

Initially, Proxima d was considered a candidate exoplanet because it had not been independently confirmed by more than one observatory, but some astronomers regarded it as confirmed because it could be detected via different methods of measuring the same radial velocity data. As of 2022, Proxima d had been detected by the ESPRESSO spectrograph on the Very Large Telescope, and also at a 2σ level (which does not constitute confirmation) by the HARPS spectrograph at the La Silla Observatory. Independent confirmation of Proxima d was achieved with the NIRPS spectrograph in work published in July 2025.

In May 2026, a study of Proxima Centauri found evidence of star-planet magnetic interaction for both Proxima d and Proxima b, implying the presence of magnetic fields on both planets. Proxima d is estimated to have a magnetic field strength of around 16 G, much greater than that of Earth (0.25–0.65 G). Similar star-planet interaction was previously observed at YZ Ceti b.

== See also ==
- List of nearest exoplanets
- List of smallest exoplanets
- Proxima Centauri c
