= Proxima Centauri c =

Exoplanet candidate orbiting Proxima Centauri

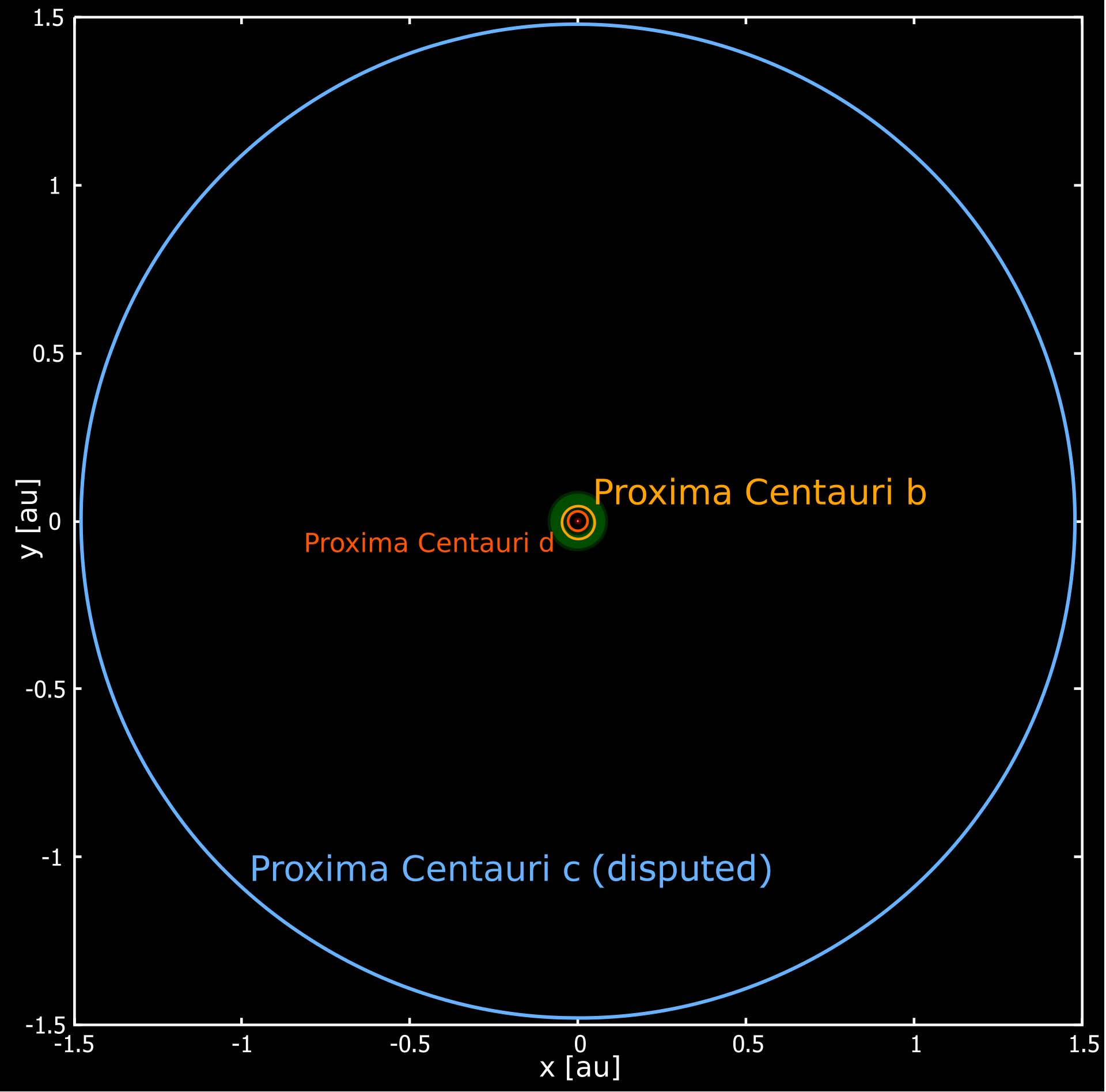
- Orbits of Proxima d, Proxima b and Proxima c around Proxima Centauri

Discovery
- Discovered by: Damasso et al.
- Discovery site: HARPS
- Discovery date: January 2020
- Detection method: Radial velocity

Orbital characteristics
- Semi-major axis: 1.489±0.049 AU
- Eccentricity: 0.04±0.01
- Orbital period (sidereal): 1928±20 d
- Inclination: 133±1
- Longitude of ascending node: 331±1
- Longitude of periastron: −4±4
- Time of periastron: 2456202±21
- Semi-amplitude: 1.1±0.2
- Star: Proxima Centauri

Physical characteristics
- Mass: 7±1 M_{🜨}
- Temperature: 39 K (−234.2 °C; −389.5 °F)

Proxima Centauri c (also called Proxima c or Alpha Centauri Cc) is a disputed exoplanet candidate, proposed to be orbiting the red dwarf star Proxima Centauri, which is the closest star to the Sun and part of a triple star system. It is located approximately 4.2 light-years (1.3 parsecs; 40 trillion kilometres; 25 trillion miles) from Earth in the constellation of Centaurus. If Proxima c exists, this would make it, along with Proxima b and Proxima d, the closest known exoplanets to the Solar System.

== Characteristics ==
As originally proposed, Proxima Centauri c would be a super-Earth or mini-Neptune about 7 times as massive as Earth, (Note: Mass estimates range from the original minimum mass of 5.8±1.9 M_{🜨}, to 18±5 M_{🜨}.) orbiting at roughly 1.49 AU (223 million km; 139 million mi) every 1,928 days (5.28 years). Due to its large mass and its distance from Proxima Centauri, the exoplanet would be uninhabitable and too cold for liquid water to exist on the surface, with an equilibrium temperature of approximately 39 K (−234.2 °C; −389.5 °F). According to a 2025 study, the originally proposed planet most likely does not exist, but there may be a smaller planet with a similar orbit.

The planet does not transit its parent star from the point of view of an Earth-based observer.

== Discovery ==
The planet candidate was first reported by Italian astrophysicist Mario Damasso and his colleagues in April 2019. Damasso's team had noticed minor movements of Proxima Centauri in the radial velocity data from the European Southern Observatory (ESO) HARPS instrument, analyzed earlier by Ukrainian astrophysicist Yakiv Pavlenko and his colleagues at the Instituto de Astrofísica de Canarias, indicating a possible second planet orbiting Proxima Centauri. The discovery was published on 15 January 2020.

Subsequent studies in 2020 also found evidence for Proxima c via astrometry, including Hubble data from c. 1995, allowing its inclination and true mass to be determined. Also in June 2020, a possible directly imaged counterpart of Proxima c was detected in the infrared with SPHERE, but the authors admit that they "did not obtain a clear detection". If their candidate source is in fact Proxima Centauri c, it is too bright for a planet of its mass and age, implying that the planet may have a ring system with a radius of around 5 R_{J}. At the time, the multiple lines of evidence appeared to confirm the planet.

However, a 2022 study questioned the planetary nature of the observed radial velocity signal corresponding to Proxima c, whose detection could not be recreated, attributing it to systematic effects. As of 2025, evidence for Proxima c remains inconclusive; observations with the NIRPS spectrograph were unable to confirm it, but found hints of a lower-amplitude signal, different from the originally proposed planet, with a similar period. Another 2025 study, reanalyzing Hubble and Gaia astrometry, estimated a mass of 3.4+5.2
−3.4 M_{🜨} for Proxima c, assuming a circular, face-on orbit. This is broadly consistent with previous estimates, but also consistent with a non-detection.
