= Sub-Earth =

Planet smaller than Earth

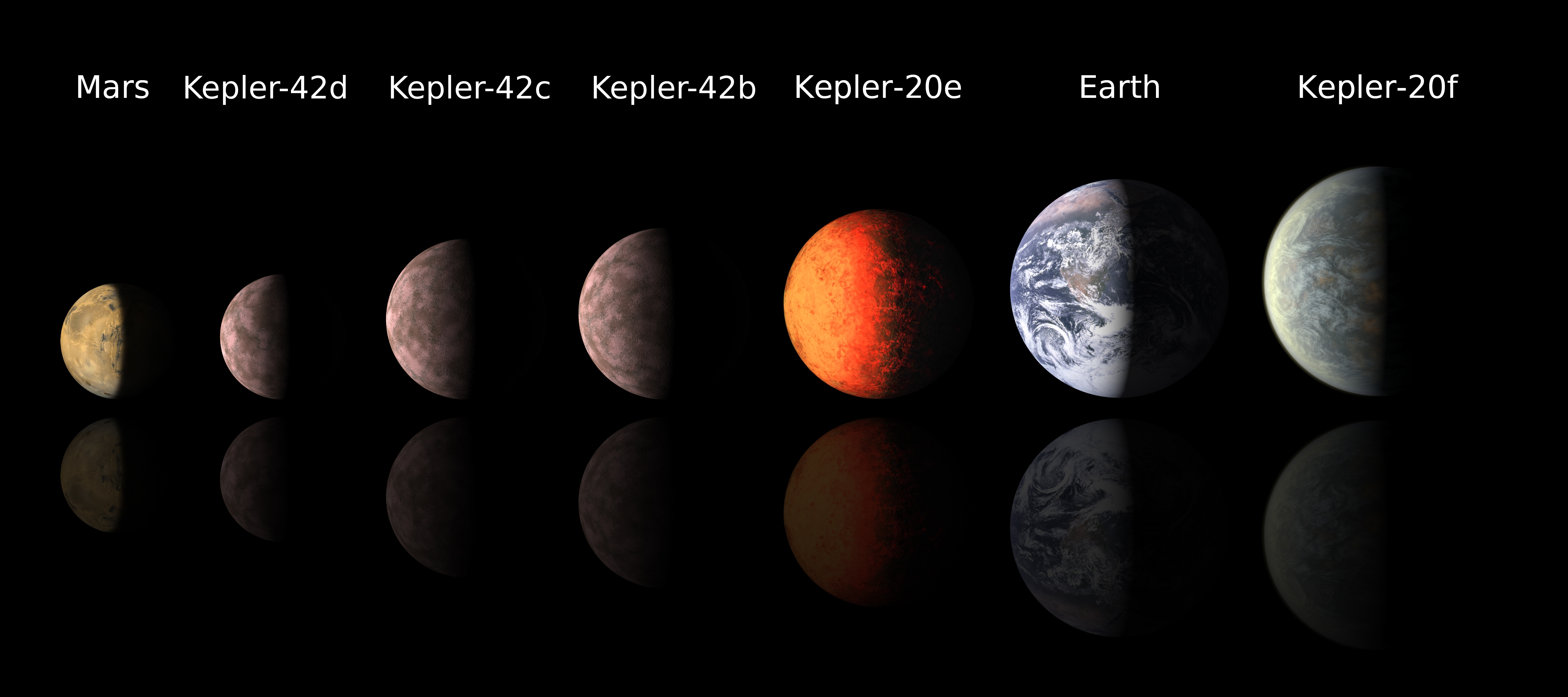
Comparing the size of Earth, Mars, and exoplanets of Kepler-20 and Kepler-42

A sub-Earth is a planet "substantially less massive" than Earth and Venus. In the Solar System, this category includes Mercury and Mars.

== Characteristics ==
Sub-Earth exoplanets are among the most difficult type to detect because their small sizes and masses produce the weakest signals. Despite the difficulty, one of the first exoplanets found was a sub-Earth around a millisecond pulsar PSR B1257+12. The smallest known is WD 1145+017 b with a size of 0.15 Earth radii, or somewhat smaller than Pluto. However, WD 1145+017 b is not massive enough to qualify as a sub-Earth classical planet and is instead defined as a minor, or dwarf, planet. It is orbiting within a thick cloud of dust and gas as chunks of itself continually break off to then spiral in towards the star, and within around 5,000 years it will have more-or-less disintegrated.

The Kepler space telescope opened up a new realm of sub-Earth discoveries. On January 10, 2012, Kepler discovered the first three sub-Earths around an ordinary star, Kepler-42. As of June 2014, Kepler has 45 confirmed planets that are smaller than Earth, with 17 of them being smaller than 0.8 R_{ⴲ}. In addition, there are over 310 planet candidates with an estimated radius of <1 R_{ⴲ}, with 135 of them being smaller than 0.8 R_{ⴲ}.

There is a confirmed sub-Earth orbiting Proxima Centauri, the closest star to the Sun. The mass of Proxima d is believed to be between that of Mars and Venus, over 0.26 Earth masses.

== Deficiency ==
Sub-Earths commonly lack substantial atmospheres because of their low gravity and weak magnetic fields, allowing stellar radiation to wear away their atmospheres. Due to their small sizes, and unless there are significant tidal forces when orbiting close to the parent star, sub-Earths also have short periods of geologic activity.
