= Sergei Odintsov =

Spanish-based Russian astrophysicist (born 1959)

- Сергей Одинцов
- Born: 1959 (age 66–67); Shchuchinsk, Kokchetav Oblast, Kazakh SSR, Soviet Union
- Education: Tomsk State University
- Scientific career
- Fields: Cosmology; Astrophysics; Quantum field theory; Quantum gravity
- Institutions: ICREA; Institut de les Ciències de l'Espai

Sergei Dmitriyevich Odintsov (Russian: Сергей Дмитриевич Одинцов; born 1959) is a Russian astrophysicist active in the fields of cosmology, quantum field theory and quantum gravity. He received his master's degree and PhD in Physics at the Tomsk State University. Odintsov is an ICREA Research Professor at the Institut de Ciències de l'Espai (Barcelona) since 2003. He also collaborates as group leader at research projects of the Tomsk State Pedagogical University. He is editor-in-chief of Symmetry, and is a member of the editorial boards of Gravitation and Cosmology, International Journal of Geometric Methods in Modern Physics, International Journal of Modern Physics D, Journal of Gravity, Universe, Russian Physics Journal and the Tomsk State Pedagogical University Bulletin. Odintsov also is an advisory panel member of Classical and Quantum Gravity.

In 2011, Odintsov was included in the list of the top 10 most well-known scientists of Russian origin according to Forbes. In 2014, he was included in the list of The World's Most Influential Scientific Minds: 2014 according to Thomson Reuters.

== Bibliography ==
Odintsov has published 730 research articles with over 70.000 citations with an h-index of 127.

His main scientific results are in the fields of quantum field theory and quantum gravity and include the complete development of renormalization group in curved space, the discovery of asymptotic conformal invariance, and a full description of curvature-induced phase transitions. In cosmology, together with Shin'ichi Nojiri, Odintsov has proposed brane-world inflation (independently from the same proposal by Stephen Hawking). In the study of dark energy cosmology, with Emilio Elizalde and Shin'ichi Nojiri, Odintsov proposed a dark energy model consisting of complex scalar or two scalars (such model was later called quintom) with possibility to realize phantom or quintessence type of acceleration as well as remove finite singularity there by quantum effects. Together with Shin'ichi Nojiri, Odintsov also proposed a generalized holographic dark energy model which includes eventually all possible variations over original holographic dark energy.

In 2002, Salvatore Capozziello proposed a fundamental new perspective of dark energy as caused by a modification of gravitational theory. Based on this idea and further developing it, Odintsov and Shin'ichi Nojiri proposed the first unified picture for the evolution of the universe based on modified gravity. According to this, the evolution of the universe changes the gravitational theory, so that modified gravity changes the evolution of the universe making it to be accelerating at the very early and very late epochs. Later, they also demonstrated that such unified inflationary-dark energy universe may be achieved in modified Gauss-Bonnet gravity and non-local gravity. This picture became even more popular recently due to the increasing possibility that inflation is caused by modified gravity which differs from the usual general relativity.

== Awards ==
- Foreign Member of the Royal Norwegian Society of Sciences and Letters since 2003.
- Foreign Member of Serbian Academy of Nonlinear Sciences
- Annual Scientific Prize of Tomsk Oblast 2003.
- Tomsk Oblast Governor fellowship in Natural Sciences, 2011
- Amaldi Medal: European Prize for Gravitational Physics 2014
