= Shin'ichi Nojiri =

Japanese physicist

Shin'ichi Nojiri (野尻 伸一, Nojiri Shin'ichi) is a Japanese theoretical cosmologist specializing in long-range modified models of gravity. He has collaborated with Sergei Odintsov on these topics. Nojiri is currently affiliated with the Division of Particle and Astrophysical Science at Nagoya University.
