= Proxima Centauri =

Nearest star to the Solar System

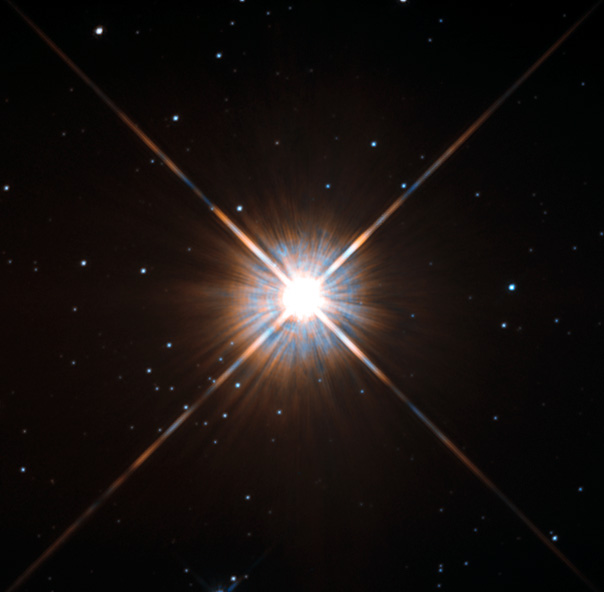
- False color Hubble Space Telescope WFPC2 image taken in 2013. The bright lines are diffraction spikes.

Observation data Epoch J2000.0 Equinox J2000.0 (ICRS)
- Constellation: Centaurus
- Pronunciation: /ˌprɒksəmə sɛnˈtɔːri/ or /ˈprɒksɪmə sɛnˈtɔːraɪ/
- Right ascension: 14^{h} 29^{m} 42.946^{s}
- Declination: −62° 40′ 46.16″
- Apparent magnitude (V): 10.43 – 11.11

Characteristics
- Evolutionary stage: Main sequence
- Spectral type: M5.5Ve
- Variable type: UV Cet + BY Dra

Astrometry
| Radial velocity (R_{v}) | −22.204±0.032 km/s |
| Proper motion (μ) | RA: −3781.741 mas/yr Dec.: 769.465 mas/yr |
| Parallax (π) | 768.0665±0.0499 mas |
| Distance | 4.2465 ± 0.0003 ly (1.30197 ± 0 pc) |
| Absolute magnitude (M_{V}) | 15.60 |

Orbit
| Primary | Alpha Centauri AB |
| Secondary | Proxima Centauri |
| Period (P) | 547,000+6,600 −4,000 yr |
| Semi-major axis (a) | 8,700+700 −400 AU |
| Eccentricity (e) | 0.50+0.08 −0.09 |
| Inclination (i) | 107.6+1.8 −2.0° |
| Longitude of the node (Ω) | 126±5° |
| Periastron epoch (T) | +283+59 −41 |
| Argument of periastron (ω) (secondary) | 72.3+8.7 −6.6° |

Details
| Mass | 0.1221±0.0022 M_{☉} |
| Radius | 0.162±0.004 R_{☉} |
| Luminosity (bolometric) | 0.001567±0.000020 L_{☉} |
| Luminosity (visual, L_{V}) | 0.00005 (Note: From knowing the absolute visual magnitude of Proxima Centauri, $M_{V_\ast} = 15.6$, and the absolute visual magnitude of the Sun, $M_{V_\odot} = 4.83$, the visual luminosity of Proxima Centauri can therefore be calculated: $L_{V_\ast}/L_{V_\odot} = 10^{0.4\left(M_{V_\odot} - M_{V_\ast}\right)} = 4.92\times10^{-5}.$) L_{☉} |
| Habitable zone inner limit | 0.03731±0.0075 au |
| Habitable zone outer limit | 0.088±0.017 au |
| Surface gravity (log g) | 5.20±0.23 cgs |
| Temperature | 2,833±49 K |
| Metallicity [Fe/H] | 0.21 (Note: If Proxima Centauri was a later capture into the Alpha Centauri star system then its metallicity and age could be quite different to that of Alpha Centauri A and B. Through comparing Proxima Centauri to other similar stars it was estimated that it had a lower metallicity, ranging from less than a third, to about the same, of the Sun's.) dex |
| Rotation | 84.9±0.6 days |
| Rotational velocity (v sin i) | < 0.1 km/s |
| Age | 4.85 Gyr |

Other designations
- Alf Cen C, Alpha Centauri C, V645 Centauri, GJ 551, HIP 70890, CCDM J14396-6050C, LFT 1110, LHS 49, LPM 526, LTT 5721, NLTT 37460

Database references
| SIMBAD | data |
| Exoplanet Archive | data |
| ARICNS | data |

Proxima Centauri is the nearest star to Earth after the Sun, located 4.25 light-years (1.3 parsecs) away in the southern constellation of Centaurus. Discovered in 1915 by Robert Innes, it is a small, low-mass star, too faint to be seen with the naked eye, with an apparent magnitude of 11.13. Proxima Centauri is a member of the Alpha Centauri star system, being identified as component Alpha Centauri C, and is 2.18° southwest of the Alpha Centauri AB pair. It is currently 12,950 AU (0.2 ly) from AB, which it orbits with a period of about 550,000 years. Its Latin name means the 'nearest [star] of Centaurus'.

Proxima Centauri is a red dwarf star with a mass about 12.5% of the Sun's mass (M_{☉}), and average density about 33 times that of the Sun. Because of Proxima Centauri's proximity to Earth, its angular diameter can be measured directly. Its actual diameter is about one-seventh (15%) the diameter of the Sun. Although it has a very low average luminosity, Proxima Centauri is a flare star that randomly undergoes dramatic increases in brightness because of magnetic activity. The star's magnetic field is created by convection throughout the stellar body, and the resulting flare activity generates a total X-ray emission similar to that produced by the Sun. The internal mixing of its fuel by convection through its core and Proxima's relatively low energy-production rate, mean that it will be a main-sequence star for another four trillion years.

Proxima Centauri has two known exoplanets and one candidate exoplanet: Proxima Centauri b, Proxima Centauri d and the disputed Proxima Centauri c. (Note: Extrasolar planet names are designated following the International Astronomical Union's naming conventions in alphabetical order according to their respective dates of discovery, with 'Proxima Centauri a' being the star itself.) Proxima Centauri b orbits the star at a distance of roughly 0.05 AU (7.5 million km) with an orbital period of approximately 11.2 Earth days. Its estimated mass is at least 1.06 times that of Earth. Proxima b orbits within Proxima Centauri's habitable zone—the range where temperatures are right for liquid water to exist on its surface—but, because Proxima Centauri is a red dwarf and a flare star, the planet's habitability is highly uncertain. A sub-Earth, Proxima Centauri d, roughly 0.028 AU (4.2 million km) away, orbits it every 5.1 days. A candidate sub-Neptune, Proxima Centauri c, roughly 1.5 AU (220 million km) away from Proxima Centauri, orbits it every 1,900 d (5.2 yr).

== General characteristics ==
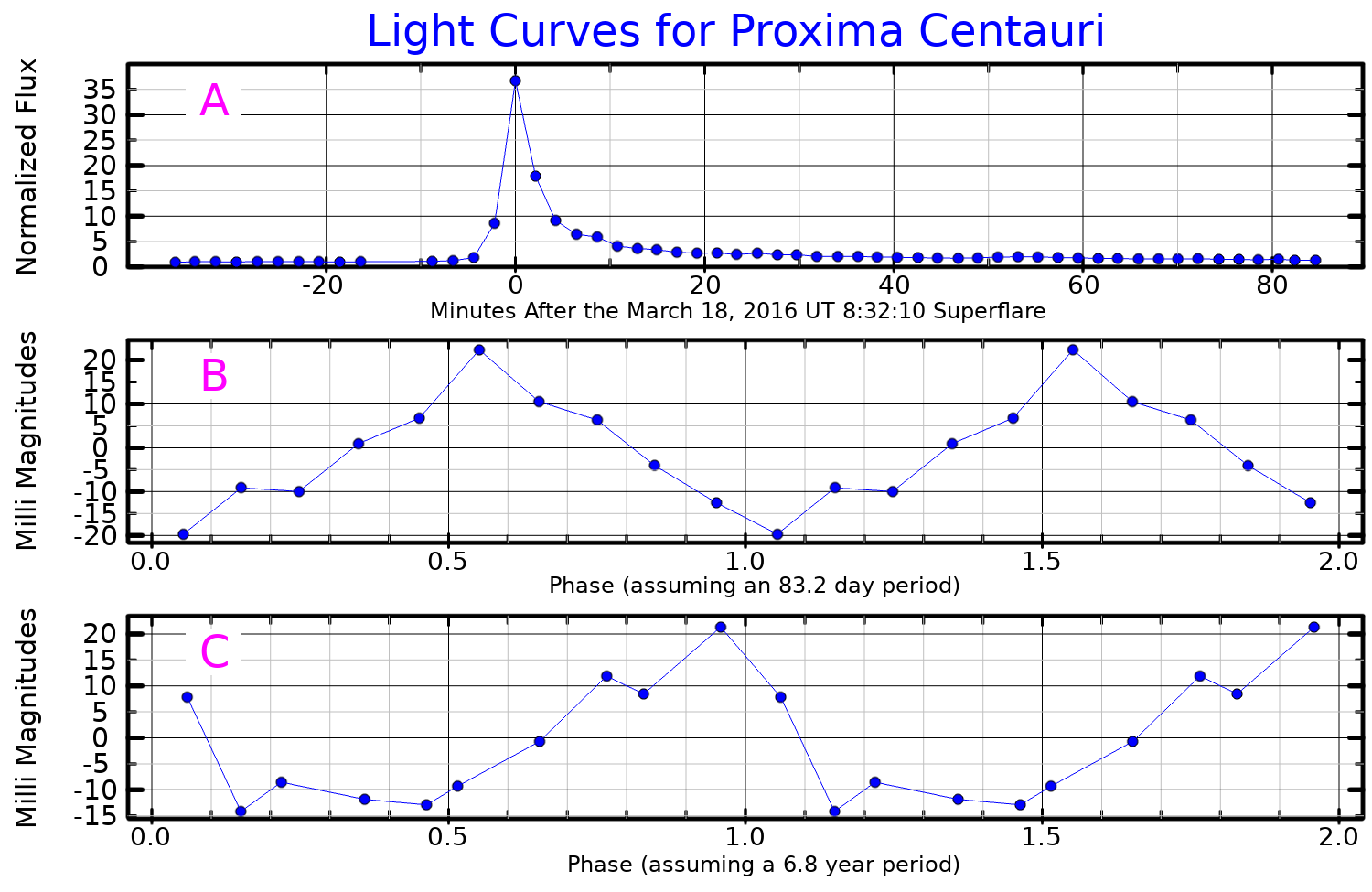
Three visual band light curves for Proxima Centauri are shown, illustrating the variability of Proxima. Plot A shows a superflare which dramatically increased the star's brightness for a few minutes. Plot B shows the relative brightness variation over the course of the star's 83 day rotation period. Plot C shows variation over a 6.8 year period, which may be the length of the star's magnetic activity period. Adapted from Howard et al. (2018) and Mascareño et al. (2016)

Proxima Centauri is a red dwarf, because it belongs to the main sequence on the Hertzsprung–Russell diagram and is of spectral class M5.5. The M5.5 class means that it falls in the low-mass end of M-type dwarf stars, with its hue shifted toward red-yellow by an effective temperature of ~3,000 K. Its absolute visual magnitude, or its visual magnitude as viewed from a distance of 10 parsecs (33 ly), is 15.5. Its total luminosity over all wavelengths is only 0.16% that of the Sun, although when observed in the wavelengths of visible light to which the eye is most sensitive, it is only 0.0056% as luminous as the Sun. More than 85% of its radiated power is at infrared wavelengths.

In 2002, optical interferometry with the Very Large Telescope (VLTI) found that the angular diameter of Proxima Centauri is 1.02±0.08 mas. Because its distance is known, the actual diameter of Proxima Centauri can be calculated to be about 1/7 that of the Sun, or 1.5 times that of Jupiter. The star's mass, estimated from stellar theory, is 12.2% M_{☉}, or 129 Jupiter masses (M_{J}). The mass has been calculated directly, although with less precision, from observations of microlensing events to be 0.150+0.062
−0.051 M_{☉}.

Lower mass main-sequence stars have higher mean density than higher mass ones, and Proxima Centauri is no exception: it has a mean density of 47.1×10^{3} kg/m^{3} (47.1 g/cm^{3}), compared with the Sun's mean density of 1.411×10^{3} kg/m^{3} (1.411 g/cm^{3}). (Note: The density (ρ) is given by the mass divided by the volume. Relative to the Sun, therefore, the density is $\rho = \frac{M}{M_\odot} \cdot \left( \frac{R}{R_\odot} \right)^{-3} \cdot \rho_\odot$ = 0.122 · 0.154^{−3} · (1.41 × 10^{3} kg/m^{3}) = 33.4 · (1.41 × 10^{3} kg/m^{3}) = 4.71 × 10^{4} kg/m^{3}, where ρ_{☉} is the average solar density. See: Munsell, Kirk; Smith, Harman; Davis, Phil; Harvey, Samantha (11 June 2008). "Sun: facts & figures". Solar system exploration. NASA. Archived from the original on 2 January 2008.; Bergman, Marcel W.; Clark, T. Alan; Wilson, William J. F. (2007). Observing projects using Starry Night Enthusiast (8th ed.). Macmillan. pp. 220–221. ISBN 978-1-4292-0074-5.) The measured surface gravity of Proxima Centauri, given as the base-10 logarithm of the acceleration in units of cgs, is 5.20. This is 162 times the surface gravity on Earth. (Note: The standard surface gravity on the Earth is 980.665 cm/s^{2}, for a "log g" value of 2.992. The difference in logarithms is 5.20 − 2.99 = 2.21, yielding a multiplier of 10^{2.21} = 162. For the Earth's gravity, see: Taylor, Barry N., ed. (2001). The International System of Units (SI) (PDF). United States Department of Commerce: National Institute of Standards and Technology. p. 29.)

A 1998 study of photometric variations indicated that Proxima Centauri completes a full rotation once every 83.5 days. A subsequent time series analysis of chromospheric indicators in 2002 suggested a longer rotation period of 116.6±0.7 days. Later observations of the star's magnetic field subsequently revealed that the star rotates with a period of 89.8±4 days, consistent with a measurement of 92.1+4.2
−3.5 days from radial velocity observations; the most recent estimate as of 2026 is 84.9±0.6 days. It is thought to rotate at an inclination of 47°±7° to the line of sight.

== Structure and fusion ==
Because of its low mass, the interior of the star is completely convective, causing energy to be transferred to the exterior by the physical movement of plasma rather than through radiative processes. This convection means that the helium ash left over from the thermonuclear fusion of hydrogen does not accumulate at the core but is instead circulated throughout the star. Unlike the Sun, which will only burn through about 10% of its total hydrogen supply before leaving the main sequence, Proxima Centauri will consume nearly all of its fuel before the fusion of hydrogen comes to an end.

Convection is associated with the generation and persistence of a magnetic field. The magnetic energy from this field is released at the surface through stellar flares that briefly (as short as per ten seconds) increase the overall luminosity of the star. On 6 May 2019, a flare event bordering Solar M and X flare class, briefly became the brightest ever detected, with a far ultraviolet emission of 2×10^{30} erg. These flares can grow as large as the star and reach temperatures measured as high as 27 million K—hot enough to radiate X-rays. Proxima Centauri's quiescent X-ray luminosity, approximately (4–16) × 10^{26} erg/s ((4–16) × 10^{19} W), is roughly equal to that of the much larger Sun. The peak X-ray luminosity of the largest flares can reach 10^{28} erg/s (10^{21} W).

Proxima Centauri's chromosphere is active, and its spectrum displays a strong emission line of singly ionized magnesium at a wavelength of 280 nm. About 88% of the surface of Proxima Centauri may be active, a percentage that is much higher than that of the Sun even at the peak of the solar cycle. Even during quiescent periods with few or no flares, this activity increases the corona temperature of Proxima Centauri to 3.5 million K, compared to the 2 million K of the Sun's corona, and its total X-ray emission is comparable to the sun's. Proxima Centauri's overall activity level is considered low compared to other red dwarfs, which is consistent with the star's estimated age of 4.85 × 10^{9} years, since the activity level of a red dwarf is expected to steadily wane over billions of years as its stellar rotation rate decreases. The activity level appears to vary with a period of roughly 442 days, which is shorter than the Sun's solar cycle of 11 years.

Proxima Centauri has a relatively weak stellar wind, no more than 20% of the mass-loss rate of the solar wind. Because the star is much smaller than the Sun, the mass loss per unit surface area from Proxima Centauri may be eight times that from the Sun's surface.

== Life phases ==
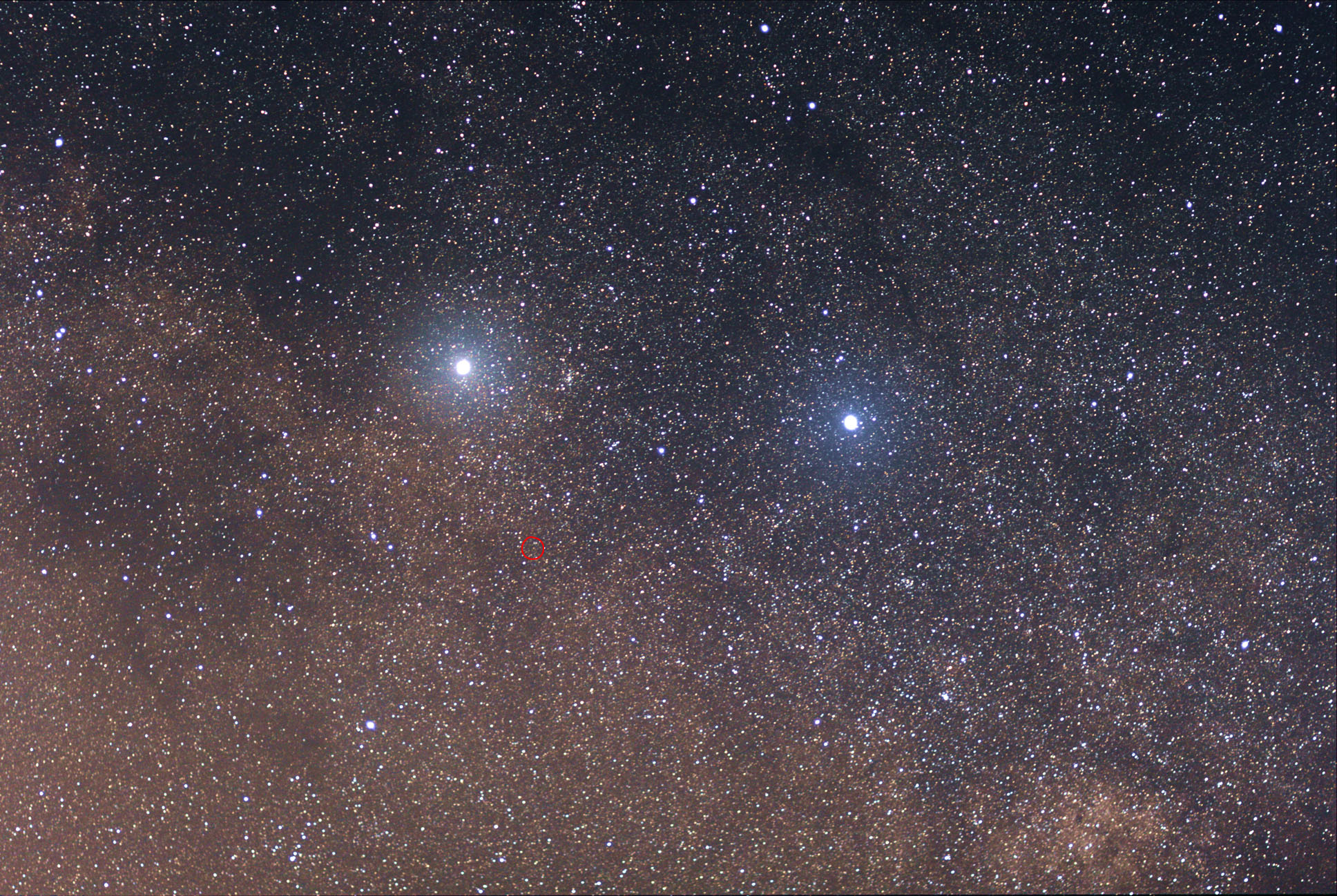
Alpha Centauri A and B are the bright apparent star to the left, which are in a triple star system with Proxima Centauri, circled in red. The bright star system to the right is the unrelated Beta Centauri.

A red dwarf with the mass of Proxima Centauri will remain on the main sequence for about four trillion years. As the proportion of helium increases because of hydrogen fusion, the star will become smaller and hotter, gradually transforming into a so-called "blue dwarf". Near the end of this period it will become significantly more luminous, reaching 2.5% of the Sun's luminosity (L_{☉}) and warming any orbiting bodies for a period of several billion years. When the hydrogen fuel is exhausted, Proxima Centauri will then evolve into a helium white dwarf (without passing through the red giant phase) and steadily lose any remaining heat energy.

The Alpha Centauri system may have formed through a low-mass star being dynamically captured by a more massive binary of 1.5–2 M_{☉} within their embedded star cluster before the cluster dispersed. However, more accurate measurements of the radial velocity are needed to confirm this hypothesis. If Proxima Centauri was bound to the Alpha Centauri system during its formation, the stars are likely to share the same elemental composition. The gravitational influence of Proxima might have disturbed the Alpha Centauri protoplanetary disks. This would have increased the delivery of volatiles such as water to the dry inner regions, so possibly enriching any terrestrial planets in the system with this material.

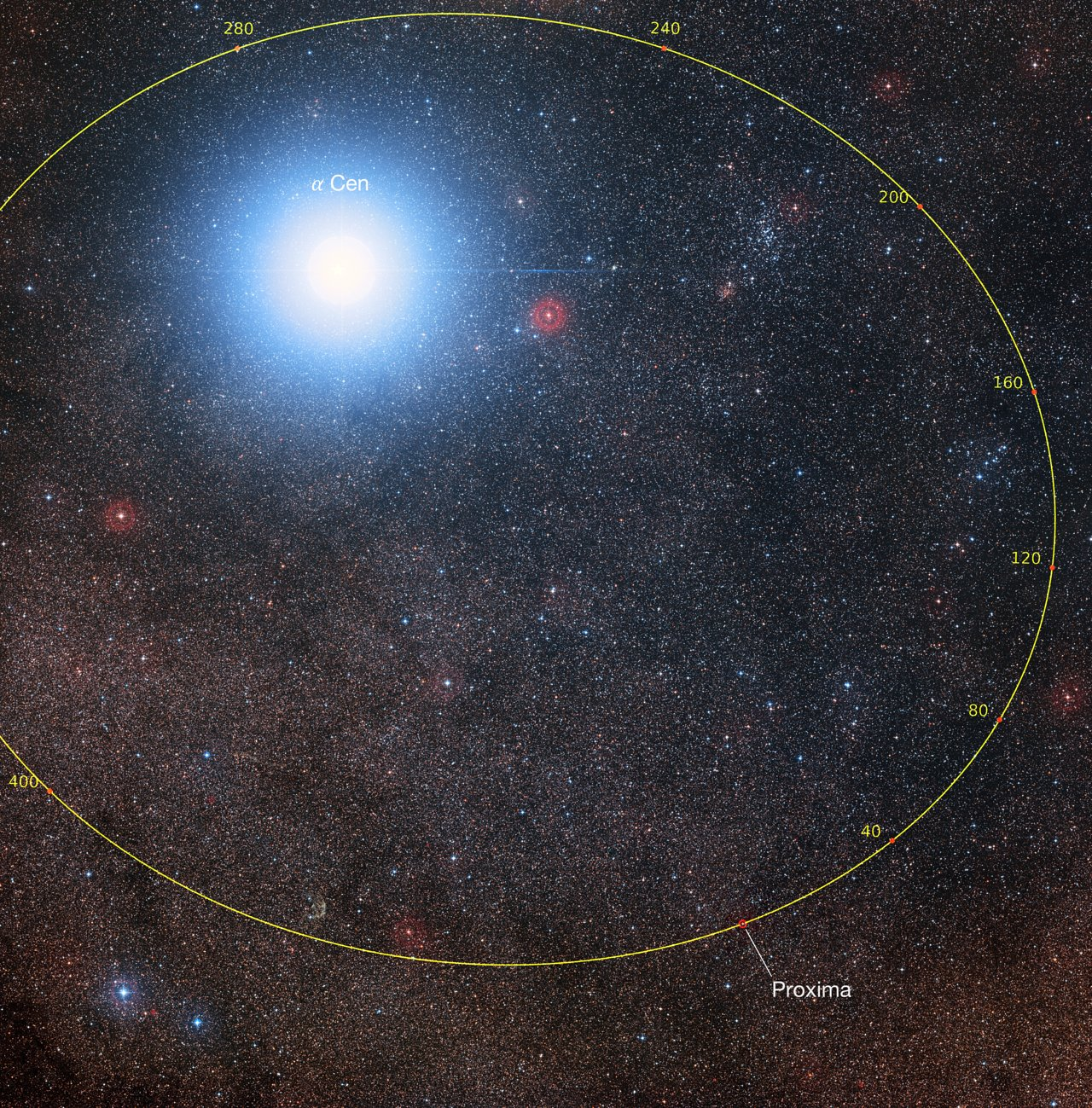
Orbital plot of Proxima Centauri around the bright apparent star Alpha Centauri AB, with position change marked (in thousands of years).

Alternatively, Proxima Centauri may have been captured at a later date during an encounter, resulting in a highly eccentric orbit that was then stabilized by the galactic tide and additional stellar encounters. Such a scenario may mean that Proxima Centauri's planetary companions have had a much lower chance for orbital disruption by Alpha Centauri. As the members of the Alpha Centauri pair continue to evolve and lose mass, Proxima Centauri is predicted to become unbound from the system in around 3.5 billion years from the present. Thereafter, the star will steadily diverge from the pair.

== Motion and location ==
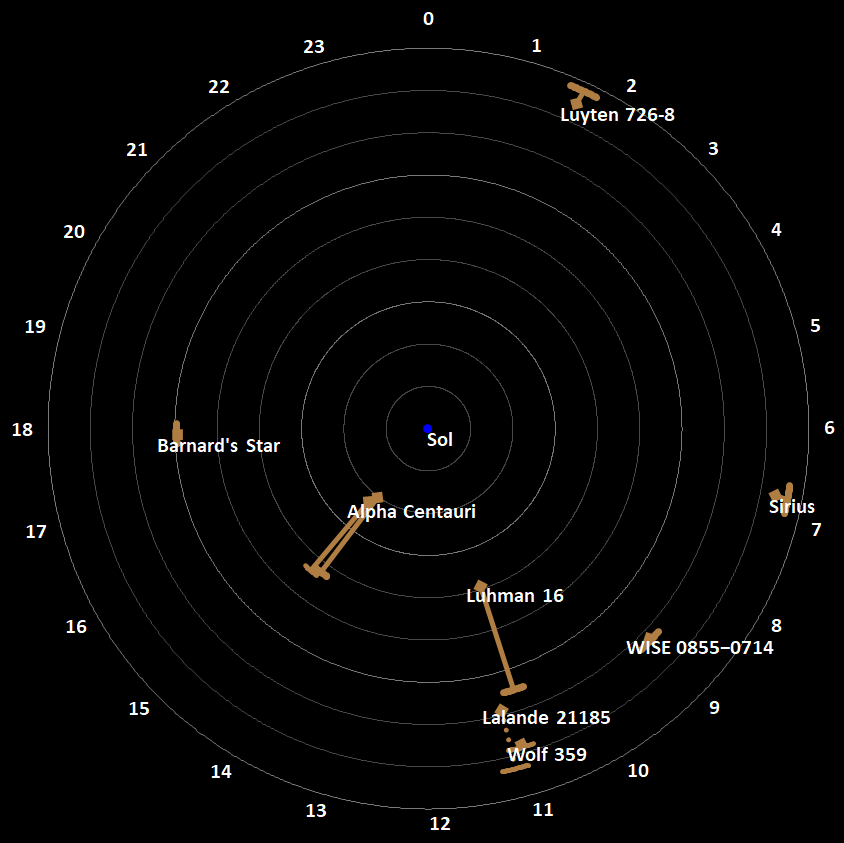
Proxima Centauri (unlabeled) next to Alpha Centauri on a radar map of all known stellar and substellar objects within 9 light-years (ly), arranged clockwise in hours of right ascension, and marked by distance (▬) and position (◆)

Based on a parallax of 768.0665±0.0499 mas, published in 2020 in Gaia Data Release 3, Proxima Centauri is 4.2465 light-years (1.3020 pc; 268,550 AU) from the Sun. Previously published parallaxes include: 768.5±0.2 mas in 2018 by Gaia DR2, 768.13±1.04 mas, in 2014 by the Research Consortium On Nearby Stars; 772.33±2.42 mas, in the original Hipparcos Catalogue, in 1997; 771.64±2.60 mas in the Hipparcos New Reduction, in 2007; and 768.77±0.37 mas using the Hubble Space Telescope's fine guidance sensors, in 1999. From Earth's vantage point, Proxima Centauri is separated from Alpha Centauri by 2.18 degrees, or four times the angular diameter of the full Moon. Proxima Centauri has a relatively large proper motion—moving 3.85 arcseconds per year across the sky. It has a radial velocity towards the Sun of 22.2 km/s. From Proxima Centauri, the Sun would appear as a bright 0.4-magnitude star in the constellation Cassiopeia, similar to Achernar or Procyon from Earth. (Note: The coordinates of the Sun would be diametrically opposite Proxima Centauri, at α=02^{h} 29^{m} 42.9487^{s}, δ=+62° 40′ 46.141″. The absolute magnitude M_{v} of the Sun is 4.83, so at a parallax π of 0.77199 the apparent magnitude m is given by 4.83 − 5(log_{10}(0.77199) + 1) = 0.40. See: Tayler, Roger John (1994). The Stars: Their Structure and Evolution. Cambridge University Press. p. 16. ISBN 978-0-521-45885-6.) The star is located in the G-Cloud.

Among the known stars, Proxima Centauri has been the closest star to the Sun for about 32,000 years and will be so for about another 25,000 years, after which Alpha Centauri A and Alpha Centauri B will alternate approximately every 79.91 years as the closest star to the Sun. In 2001, J. García-Sánchez et al. predicted that Proxima Centauri will make its closest approach to the Sun in approximately 26,700 years, coming within 3.11 ly (0.95 pc). A 2010 study by V. V. Bobylev predicted a closest approach distance of 2.90 ly (0.89 pc) in about 27,400 years, followed by a 2014 study by C. A. L. Bailer-Jones predicting a perihelion approach of 3.07 ly (0.94 pc) in roughly 26,710 years. Proxima Centauri is orbiting through the Milky Way at a distance from the Galactic Centre that varies from 27 to 31 kly (8.3 to 9.5 kpc), with an orbital eccentricity of 0.07.

=== Alpha Centauri ===
Proxima Centauri has been suspected to be a companion of the Alpha Centauri binary star system since its discovery in 1915. For this reason, it is sometimes referred to as Alpha Centauri C. Data from the Hipparcos satellite, combined with ground-based observations, were consistent with the hypothesis that the three stars are a gravitationally bound system. Kervella et al. (2017) used high-precision radial velocity measurements to determine with a high degree of confidence that Proxima and Alpha Centauri are gravitationally bound. Proxima Centauri's orbital period around the Alpha Centauri AB barycenter is 547,000+6,600
−4,000 years with an eccentricity of 0.5±0.08; it approaches Alpha Centauri to 4,300+1,100
−900 AU at periastron and retreats to 13,000+300
−100 AU at apastron. At present, Proxima Centauri is 12,947 ± 260 AU (1.94 ± 0.04 trillion km) from the Alpha Centauri AB barycenter, nearly to the furthest point in its orbit.

Six single stars, two binary star systems, and a triple star share a common motion through space with Proxima Centauri and the Alpha Centauri system. (The co-moving stars include HD 4391, γ^{2} Normae, and Gliese 676.) The space velocities of these stars are all within 10 km/s of Alpha Centauri's peculiar motion. Thus, they may form a moving group of stars, which would indicate a common point of origin, such as in a star cluster.

== Planetary system ==
The Proxima Centauri planetary system (Note: Planets b & d: Suárez Mascareño et al. 2025 (circular orbits assumed) Planet c: Benedict & McArthur 2020; semi-major axis from Kervella et al. 2020 Predicted radii: for planet d, Faria et al. 2022; for planet b, Brugger et al. 2016)
| Companion (in order from star) | Mass | Semimajor axis (AU) | Orbital period (days) | Eccentricity | Inclination (°) | Radius |
|---|---|---|---|---|---|---|
| d | ≥0.260±0.038 M_{🜨} | 0.02881±0.00017 | 5.12338±0.00035 | 0 | — | ~0.81±0.08 (Note: Predicted from mass-radius relationship) R_{🜨} |
| b | ≥1.055±0.055 M_{🜨} | 0.04848±0.00029 | 11.18465±0.00053 | 0 | — | 0.94 – 1.4 (Note: Range of possible radius values, depending on Proxima b's composition) R_{🜨} |
| c (disputed) | 7±1 M_{🜨} | 1.489±0.049 | 1,928±20 | 0.04±0.01 | 133±1° | — |

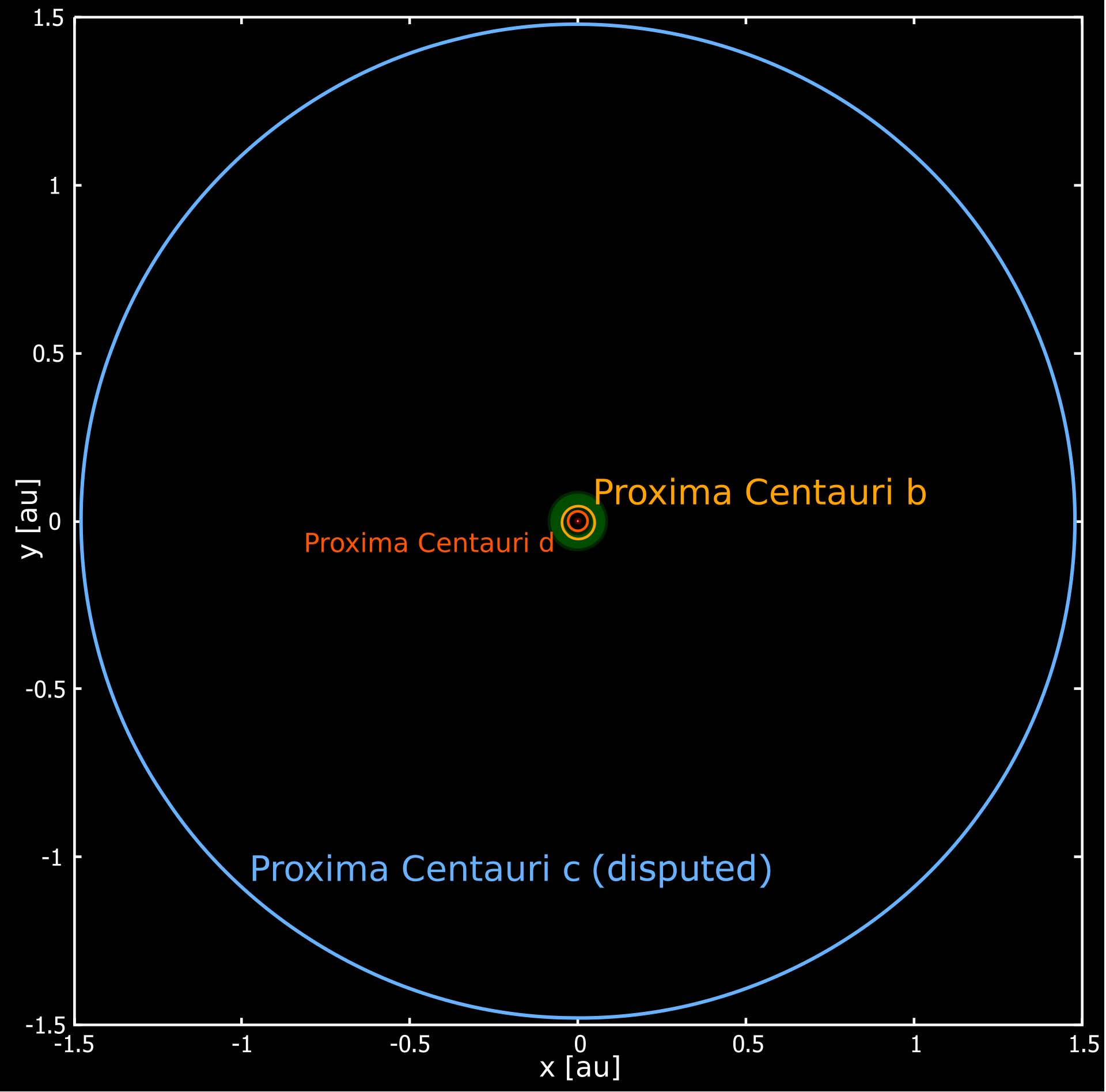
Schematic of the three planets (d, b, and c) of the Proxima Centauri system, with the habitable zone highlighted in green

As of 2025, three planets (two confirmed and one candidate) have been detected in orbit around Proxima Centauri, with one being among the lightest ever detected by radial velocity ("d"), one close to Earth's size within the habitable zone ("b"), and a possible gas dwarf that orbits much further out than the inner two ("c"), although its status remains disputed.

Searches for exoplanets around Proxima Centauri date to the late 1970s. In the 1990s, multiple measurements of Proxima Centauri's radial velocity constrained the maximum mass that a detectable companion could possess. The activity level of the star adds noise to the radial velocity measurements, complicating detection of a companion using this method. In 1998, an examination of Proxima Centauri using the Faint Object Spectrograph on board the Hubble Space Telescope appeared to show evidence of a companion orbiting at a distance of about 0.5 AU. A subsequent search using the Wide Field and Planetary Camera 2 failed to locate any companions. Astrometric measurements at the Cerro Tololo Inter-American Observatory appear to rule out a Jupiter-sized planet with an orbital period of 2−12 years.

In 2017, a team of astronomers using the Atacama Large Millimeter Array reported detecting a belt of cold dust orbiting Proxima Centauri at a range of 1−4 AU from the star. This dust has a temperature of around 40 K and has a total estimated mass of 1% of the planet Earth. They tentatively detected two additional features: a cold belt with a temperature of 10 K orbiting around 30 AU and a compact emission source about 1.2 arcseconds from the star. There was a hint at an additional warm dust belt at a distance of 0.4 AU from the star. However, upon further analysis, these emissions were determined to be most likely the result of a large flare emitted by the star in March 2017. The presence of dust within 4 AU radius from the star is not needed to model the observations.

As of 2025, radial velocity observations have ruled out the presence of any undetected planets with a minimum mass greater than 0.15 M_{🜨} with periods shorter than 10 days, 0.3 M_{🜨} in the habitable zone, 0.6 M_{🜨} up to 100 days, 1 M_{🜨} up to 1,000 days, and 4 M_{🜨} up to 10,000 days.

=== Planet b ===
Proxima Centauri b, or Alpha Centauri Cb, orbits the star at a distance of roughly 0.05 AU (7.5 million km) with an orbital period of approximately 11.2 Earth days. Its estimated mass is at least 1.07 times that of the Earth. Moreover, the equilibrium temperature of Proxima Centauri b is estimated to be within the range where water could exist as liquid on its surface; thus, placing it within the habitable zone of Proxima Centauri.

The first indications of the exoplanet Proxima Centauri b were found in 2013 by Mikko Tuomi of the University of Hertfordshire from archival observation data. To confirm the possible discovery, a team of astronomers launched the Pale Red Dot (Note: "Pale Blue Dot" is a reference to a distant photo of Earth taken by Voyager 1.) project in January 2016. On 24 August 2016, the team of 31 scientists from all around the world, led by Guillem Anglada-Escudé of Queen Mary University of London, confirmed the existence of Proxima Centauri b through a peer-reviewed article published in Nature. The measurements were performed using two spectrographs: HARPS on the ESO 3.6 m Telescope at La Silla Observatory and UVES on the 8 m Very Large Telescope at Paranal Observatory. Several attempts to detect a transit of this planet across the face of Proxima Centauri have been made. A transit-like signal appearing on 8 September 2016, was tentatively identified, using the Bright Star Survey Telescope at the Zhongshan Station in Antarctica.

In 2016, in a paper that helped to confirm Proxima Centauri b's existence, a second signal in the range of 60–500 days was detected. However, stellar activity and inadequate sampling causes its nature to remain unclear.

=== Planet c ===
Proxima Centauri c is a candidate super-Earth or gas dwarf about 7 M_{🜨} orbiting at roughly 1.5 AU (220 million km) every 1,900 days (5.2 yr). If Proxima Centauri b were the star's Earth, Proxima Centauri c would be equivalent to Neptune. Due to its large distance from Proxima Centauri, it is unlikely to be habitable, with a low equilibrium temperature of around 39 K. The planet was first reported by Italian astrophysicist Mario Damasso and his colleagues in April 2019. Damasso's team had noticed minor movements of Proxima Centauri in the radial velocity data from the ESO's HARPS instrument, indicating a possible additional planet orbiting Proxima Centauri. In 2020, the planet's existence was confirmed by Hubble astrometry data from c. 1995. A possible direct imaging counterpart was detected in the infrared with the SPHERE, but the authors admit that they "did not obtain a clear detection." If their candidate source is in fact Proxima Centauri c, it is too bright for a planet of its mass and age, implying that the planet may have a ring system with a radius of around 5 R_{J}. However, Artigau et al. (2022) disputed the radial velocity confirmation of the planet. As of 2025, evidence for Proxima c remains inconclusive; observations with the NIRPS spectrograph were unable to confirm it, but found hints of a lower-amplitude signal with a similar period.

=== Planet d ===
In 2019, a team of astronomers revisited the data from ESPRESSO about Proxima Centauri to refine its mass. While doing so, the team found another radial velocity spike with a periodicity of 5.15 days. They estimated that if it were a planetary companion, it would be no less than 0.29 Earth masses. Further analysis confirmed the signal's existence leading up to the announcement of the candidate planet in February 2022. Proxima d was independently confirmed with the NIRPS spectrograph in work published in July 2025.

In 2026, astronomers analyzed ESPRESSO data from Proxima Centauri to search for star–planet interactions in the system. The team found evidence of a strong magnetic field on Proxima d, which they estimated to have a strength of ~16 G. They also found evidence that Proxima d induces phase-locked stellar flares on Proxima Centauri, due to the strength of the planet's magnetic field and its proximity to the star.

=== Habitability ===
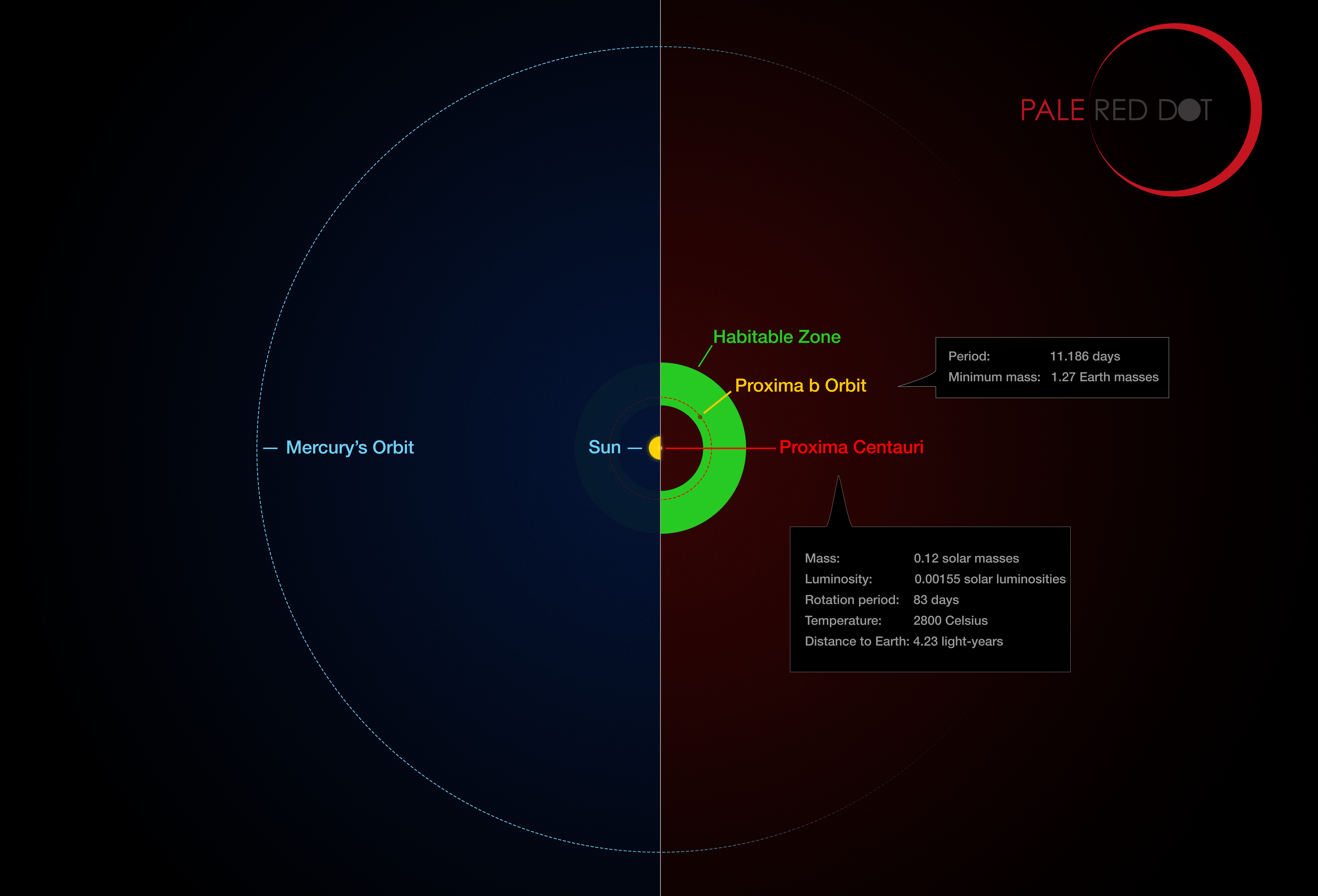
Overview and comparison of the orbital distance of the habitable zone

Before the discovery of Proxima Centauri b, the TV documentary Alien Worlds hypothesized that a life-sustaining planet could exist in orbit around Proxima Centauri or other red dwarfs. Such a planet would lie within the habitable zone of Proxima Centauri, about 0.023–0.054 AU (3.4–8.1 million km) from the star, and would have an orbital period of 3.6–14 days. A planet orbiting within this zone may experience tidal locking to the star. If the orbital eccentricity of this hypothetical planet were low, Proxima Centauri would move little in the planet's sky, and most of the surface would experience either day or night perpetually. The presence of an atmosphere could serve to redistribute heat from the star-lit side to the far side of the planet.

Proxima Centauri's flare outbursts could erode the atmosphere of any planet in its habitable zone, but the documentary's scientists thought that this obstacle could be overcome. Gibor Basri of the University of California, Berkeley argued: "No one [has] found any showstoppers to habitability." For example, one concern was that the torrents of charged particles from the star's flares could strip the atmosphere off any nearby planet. If the planet had a strong magnetic field, the field would deflect the particles from the atmosphere; even the slow rotation of a tidally locked planet that spins once for every time it orbits its star would be enough to generate a magnetic field, as long as part of the planet's interior remained molten.

Other scientists, especially proponents of the Rare Earth hypothesis, disagree that red dwarfs can sustain life. Any exoplanet in this star's habitable zone would likely be tidally locked, resulting in a relatively weak planetary magnetic moment, leading to strong atmospheric erosion by coronal mass ejections from Proxima Centauri. In December 2020, a candidate SETI radio signal BLC-1 was announced as potentially coming from the star. The signal was later determined to be human-made radio interference.

== Observational history ==
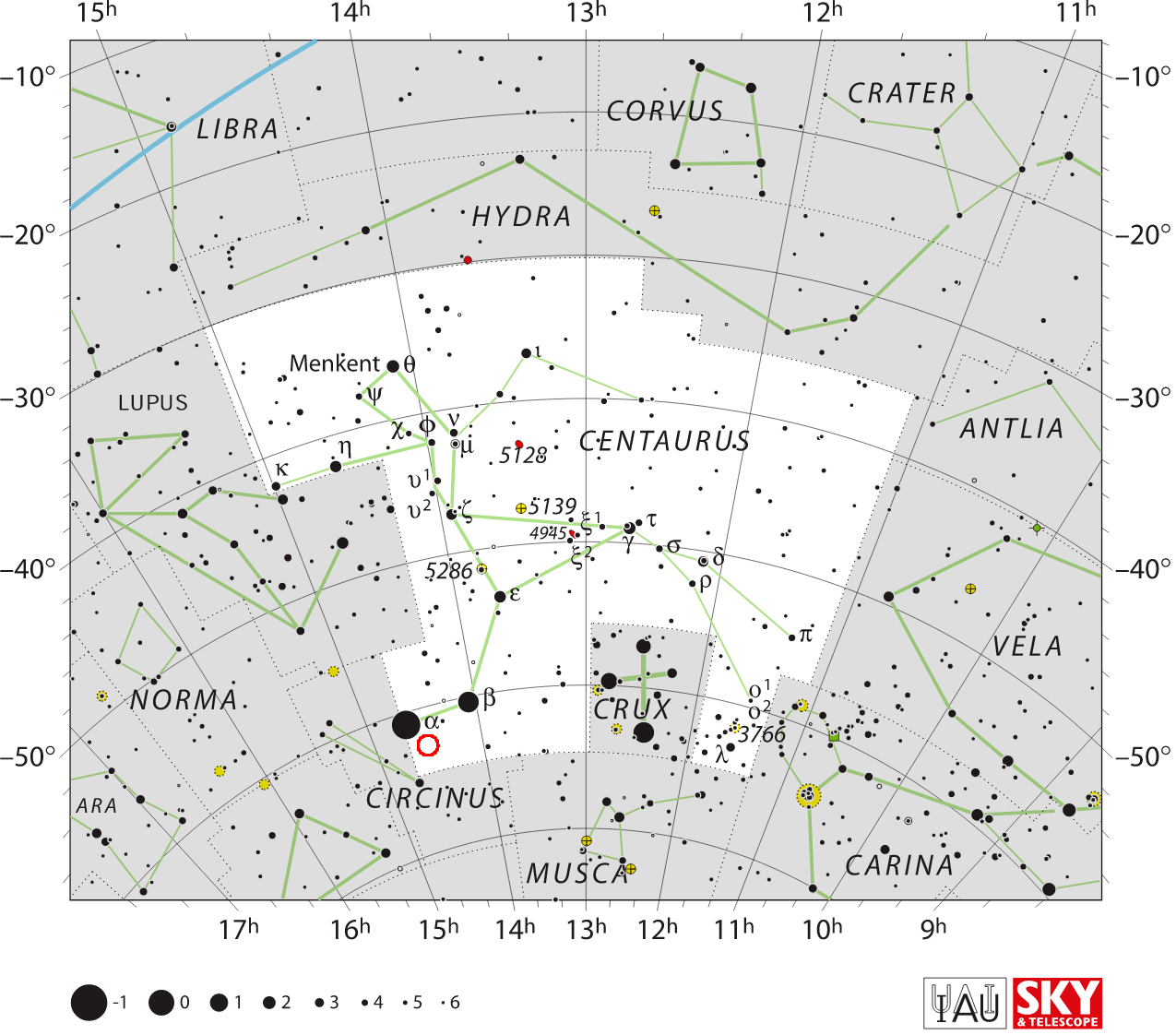
The location of Proxima Centauri (circled in red)

Parallax of Proxima Centauri as observed from New Horizons and Earth

In 1915, the Scottish astronomer Robert Innes, director of the Union Observatory in Johannesburg, South Africa, discovered a star that had the same proper motion as Alpha Centauri. He suggested that it be named Proxima Centauri (actually Proxima Centaurus). In 1917, at the Royal Observatory at the Cape of Good Hope, the Dutch astronomer Joan Voûte measured the star's trigonometric parallax at 0.755″±0.028″ and determined that Proxima Centauri was approximately the same distance from the Sun as Alpha Centauri. It was the lowest-luminosity star known at the time. An equally accurate parallax determination of Proxima Centauri was made by American astronomer Harold L. Alden in 1928, who confirmed Innes's view that it is closer, with a parallax of 0.783″±0.005″.

The size of Proxima Centauri was estimated by the Canadian astronomer John Stanley Plaskett in 1925 by interferometry. The result was 207,000 miles (333,000 km), or approximately 0.24 R_{☉}.

In 1951, American astronomer Harlow Shapley announced that Proxima Centauri is a flare star. Examination of past photographic records showed that the star displayed a measurable increase in magnitude on about 8% of the images, making it the most active flare star then known. The proximity of the star allows for detailed observation of its flare activity. In 1980, the Einstein Observatory produced a detailed X-ray energy curve of a stellar flare on Proxima Centauri. Further observations of flare activity were made with the EXOSAT and ROSAT satellites, and the X-ray emissions of smaller, solar-like flares were observed by the Japanese ASCA satellite in 1995. Proxima Centauri has since been the subject of study by most X-ray observatories, including XMM-Newton and Chandra.

Because of Proxima Centauri's southern declination, it can only be viewed south of latitude 27° N. (Note: For a star south of the zenith, the angle to the zenith is equal to the Latitude minus the Declination. The star is hidden from sight when the zenith angle is 90° or more, i.e., below the horizon. Thus, for Proxima Centauri: Highest latitude = 90° + (−62.68°) = 27.32°. See: Campbell, William Wallace (1899). The elements of practical astronomy. London: Macmillan. pp. 109–110.) Red dwarfs such as Proxima Centauri are too faint to be seen with the naked eye. Even from Alpha Centauri A or B, Proxima would only be seen as a fifth-magnitude star. It has apparent visual magnitude 11, so a telescope with an aperture of at least 8 cm (3.1 in) is needed to observe it, even under ideal viewing conditions—under clear, dark skies with Proxima Centauri well above the horizon. In 2016, the International Astronomical Union organized a Working Group on Star Names (WGSN) to catalogue and standardize proper names for stars. The WGSN approved the name Proxima Centauri for this star on August 21, 2016, and it is now so included in the List of IAU approved Star Names.

In 2016, a superflare was observed from Proxima Centauri, the strongest flare ever seen. The optical brightness increased by a factor of 68× to approximately magnitude 6.8. It is estimated that similar flares occur around five times every year but are of such short duration, just a few minutes, that they had never been observed before. On 22 and 23 April 2020, the outbound New Horizons spacecraft took images of two of the nearest stars, Proxima Centauri and Wolf 359. When compared with Earth-based images, a very large parallax effect was easily visible. However, this was only used for illustrative purposes and did not improve on previous distance measurements.

== Future exploration ==
Because of the star's proximity to Earth, Proxima Centauri has been proposed as a flyby destination for interstellar travel. If non-nuclear, conventional propulsion technologies are used, the flight of a spacecraft to Proxima Centauri and its planets would probably require thousands of years. For example, Voyager 1, which is now travelling 17 km/s (38,000 mph) relative to the Sun, would reach Proxima Centauri in 73,775 years, were the spacecraft travelling in the direction of that star and Proxima stationary. Proxima's actual galactic orbit means a slow-moving probe would have only several tens of thousands of years to catch the star at its closest approach, before it recedes out of reach.

Nuclear pulse propulsion might enable such interstellar travel with a trip timescale of a century, inspiring several studies such as Project Orion, Project Daedalus, and Project Longshot. Project Breakthrough Starshot aims to reach the Alpha Centauri system within the first half of the 21st century, with microprobes travelling at 20% of the speed of light and propelled by around 100 gigawatts of Earth-based lasers. The probes would perform a fly-by of Proxima Centauri about 20 years after their launch, or possibly go into orbit after about 140 years if swing-bys around Proxima Centauri or Alpha Centauri are to be employed. Then the probes would take photos and collect data of the planets of the stars, and their atmospheric compositions. It would take 4.25 years for the information collected to be sent back to Earth.
