= Institute of Space Sciences =

Research institute in Barcelona, Spain

The Institut de Ciències de l'Espai (ICE-CSIC) or Institute of Space Sciences is a research institute of the Spanish National Research Council (Consejo Superior de Investigaciones Científicas, CSIC), established in 1999. It is located on the campus of the Autonomous University of Barcelona in Catalonia. It specialises in the fields of space physics, astrophysics, and cosmology. Research staff include Sergei Odintsov.
