= Gersh Budker =

Soviet physicist (1918–1977)

- Born: Gersh Itskovich Budker; 1 May 1918; Murafa, near Vinnytsia, Ukrainian People's Republic (now in Ukraine)
- Died: 4 July 1977 (aged 59); Akademgorodok, Novosibirsk, Russian Soviet Federative Socialist Republic (now in Russia)
- Known for: Electron cooling
- Scientific career
- Fields: Physicist
- Workplaces: Institute of Nuclear Physics

Gersh Itskovich Budker (Герш Ицкович Будкер), also named Andrey Mikhailovich Budker (1 May 1918 – 4 July 1977), was a Soviet physicist born in Murafa in Ukrainian People's Republic (now in Ukraine), specialized in nuclear physics and accelerator physics.

== Biography ==
In 1941 Budker graduated from Moscow University. Due to the beginning of the Great Patriotic War soon afterward he went to serve in the army. In 1945 he joined the department of theoretical physics in Kurchatov's Laboratory No. 2. In 1954 he defended his doctoral thesis.

He was elected a Corresponding Member of the Siberian Division of the Soviet Academy of Sciences on 28 March 1958 and was promoted to an Academician of the Division of Nuclear Physics on 26 June 1964.

He is best known for his invention in 1968 of electron cooling, a method of reducing the emittance of particle beams by thermalisation with a co-propagating electron beam.

Academician Budker was the founder (in 1959) and first Director of the Budker Institute of Nuclear Physics in Akademgorodok, Russian SFSR. There he lived in the 100-Flat Building. His portrait decorates the famous Round Table Room in the institute. After his death, the institute was renamed the Budker Institute for Nuclear Physics in his honor.

Budker became one of the founders of Faculty of Physics of Novosibirsk State University in 1961.

Budker was married five times. He died in Akademgorodok from a heart attack at 59.

Budker's life and works were celebrated in a collection of essays by his colleagues, including Pyotr Kapitsa, Lev Landau, and Andrei Sakharov, and two by Budker himself. The collection, G. I. Budker: Reflections & Remembrances (edited by Boris Breizman) was published in 1988 and was later translated into English by James W. Van Dam.
