= PPU =

PPU or ppu may refer to:

== Education ==
- Palestine Polytechnic University, Hebron, West Bank, Palestine
- Patliputra University, Patna, India
- Point Park University, Pittsburgh, Pennsylvania, US

== Science and technology ==
- Physics processing unit, a microprocessor typically used for video games
- Picture Processing Unit, the component which generates a video signal in the Nintendo Entertainment System
- Power processing unit, a component responsible for regulating electrical power

== Organisations ==
- Peace Pledge Union, a British anti-war organisation
- Peoria and Pekin Union Railway (reporting mark: PPU), Illinois, US
- People's Protection Units, armed forces of the Kurdish Supreme Committee
- Pirate Party of Ukraine, a political party
- PPU (union), a defunct British pilots' union
- Prvi Partizan (Prvi Partizan zavod ad Užice), a Serbian ammunition manufacturer
- Pidpilna Poshta Ukrainy, a Ukrainian Latin name of the Ukrainian Underground Post, an internationally unrecognized postal agency

== Other uses ==
- Papun Airport (IATA airport code: PPU), Papun, Myanmar
- Penajam North Paser Regency (Penajam Paser Utara), a regency in East Kalimantan, Indonesia
- The Plastic People of the Universe, a Czech rock band
- Price per unit, in economics
- Papora-Hoanya language (ISO 639:ppu)
