= Battle of Murafa =

1432 battle of the Lithuanian Civil War

- Part of Lithuanian Civil War (1432–1438)
Date	30 November 1432
Location	Murafa river near Kopystyryn, Podolian land (now Vinnytsia oblast, Ukraine)
Result	First clash − Podolian victory Second clash − Polish victory (See § Aftermath)
Territorial changes	Ruthenians reconquer Podolia

Belligerents
Duchy of Podolia; Foreign mercenaries (Note: Mainly Tatars, Wallachians and Moldavians)	Kingdom of Poland

Commanders and leaders
Fedir Nesvizhsky	Jan Mężyk; Wincenty Szamotulski; Voivode Kemlycz

Casualties and losses
Several thousands killed 12 banners captured (per Polish reports)	Over a thousand killed: 2 killed from the Kelmycz's pursuing squad

The Battle of Murafa or the Battle of Kopystrzyń was a battle that consisted of two clashes between the Polish army and the forces of Podolian starosta Fedir Nesvizhsky who supported the Lithuanian prince Švitrigaila, during the Lithuanian civil war of 1432–1438. According to most sources, the Ruthenian army humiliated the Polish unit, which was crossing the Murafa River, in the first clash, however in the second clash the Podolians were defeated.

== Background ==
Ever since the civil war in Lithuania broke out, the Eastern Orthodox Ruthenian duchies showed their support for Švitrigaila, who was overthrown, replaced by Sigismund Kęstutaitis and fled to Polotsk, where he had started preparing for a war against Sigismund. On 15 of October, Kęstutaitis declared his loyalty for the Polish crown and officially ceded Podolia to Poland, which was not supported among the locals. In the autumn of 1432, the Polish army invaded Eastern Podolia with the goal of capturing it as the new Lithuanian duke had reduced his claims on the region. The Polish forces captured several towns, including Bratslav. Fedir Nesvizhsky, who had supported Švitrigaila at the time, did not attempt to fight a direct battle against the invaders but used the scorched earth tactics instead, launching indirect and quick attacks on the Poles. At the end of November, the Polish army approached Murafa River, where it had begun preparations to cross it. Nesvizhsky knew about this, so he went out to ambush the Poles, while gathering support from Tatar and Wallachian mercenaries. He crossed the river earlier and set up an ambush.

== Battle ==
On 30 of November, the Polish army started crossing the Murafa river, advancing without any worries. Nesvizhsky found out about this, and his army started encircling the Poles. Despite the fierce resistance from the Polish forces, eventually they were defeated. Following this, Ruthenian army, thinking that the Polish forces were fully crushed, started looting their camp. Soon, however, another unit, led by voivode Kemlycz appeared, forcing the Podolians to retreat. According to a Polish chronologist Guagnini, Kemlycz's unit attacked Ruthenians and pursued them for several miles until the midnight, reportedly killing several thousands of Ruthenians, Tatars and Wallachians and capturing 12 Ruthenian banners. Ukrainian historians, particularly Hrushevsky claim that the Polish unit was relatively small and that the Podolians retreated right after the Kelmycz's unit appeared.

== Aftermath ==
Generally, the battle is considered victorious by the Polish sources, which, as previously was said, mention about two battles happening there. Polish chronicler Alexander Guagnini describes the battle as a decisive Polish success, stating that the Ruthenian army was almost entirely wiped out. (Note: "When the our forces were crossing the Murakhva river, Rus' tried to pursuit them. Then Kemlycz with a hundred of cavalry, while returning to the Poles, worried the enemy with an unexpectedly strong fear, attacked the incautious Rus' and bravely fought it. The other ours, after returning from the crossing, started chasing Rus' to the death, we chased them at the night for several miles, while slaying and fighting it. Several thousands of Rus' people were killed, while only two ours.) Some historians, such as Mykhailo Hrushevsky and Roman Homan disagree with this point, stating that while the Polish unit in fact came to help for the defeated Poles and forced the Ruthenians to retreat, but it did not humiliate the Podolian army. (Note: "On 30 of November, a battle took place at Podolia, where the army of the Grand Duchy of Ruthenia, led by Feodor Korybutovych, humiliated the army of the Polish Kingdom, led by the Rus' voivode Jan Menzyk and the voivode Wincenty during the Polish crossing of the Murafa river near the village of Kopystyryn. Fedir's warriors started looting the Polish wagon train, however the approachment of a small Polish unit forced them to retreat.") The Polish leadership, however, did not use the opportunity to seize Eastern Podolia after the Ruthenian withdrawal and themselves withdrew to Lviv. Till the end of 1432, the entire Eastern Podolia was recaptured by Švitrigaila's supporters, and in 1433, Podolian forces pushed the Poles further, seized Kamianets and captured starosta Teodoryk Buczacki.
