= 100-Flat Building =

Residential building in Novosibirsk, Russia

The 100-Flat Building
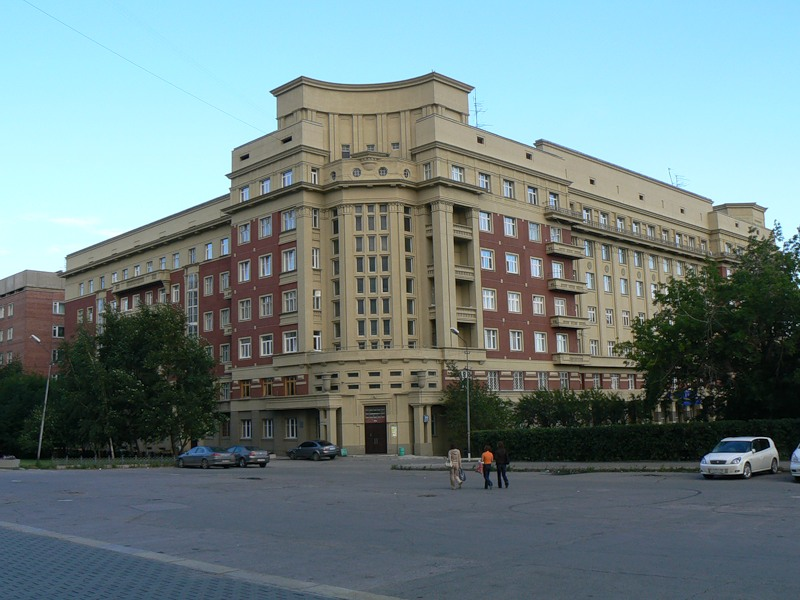
- Street view of the building

- Location within Russia

General information
- Status: Completed
- Type: Residential
- Architectural style: Art Deco, Stalinist architecture
- Location: 16 Krasny Prospekt, Novosibirsk, Russia
- Coordinates: 55.020°N 82.925°E
- Construction started: 1934
- Completed: 1937

Height
- Roof: 28.09 metres (92.2 ft)

Technical details
- Floor count: 8

Design and construction
- Architects: Andrey Kryachkov, Vitaly Maslennikov

The 100-Flat Building (The Stokvartirny House, Russian: Стоквартирный дом) is an eight-floor residential building in Novosibirsk, Russia, located at Krasny Prospekt, 16. It is a historical and cultural monument of federal significance in Russia. The building was created in 1934–1937 by prominent Russian architects Andrey Kryachkov and Vitaly Maslennikov.

== History ==
The building was originally conceived as a high-profile residential complex for the Soviet elite and arranged for 100 well-appointed apartments (hence the name). The initial project included 10 five-bedroom suites, 30 four-bedroom suites, 40 three-bedroom flats, and 20 two-bedroom flats. The flats have a well-designed layout, large living and utility rooms; some suites had small rooms for maids.

Construction of the house began in 1934. The initial exterior design was substantially complicated in the process, for architect Maslennikov added facade elements themed after the works of French architect Auguste Perret.

At the Exposition Internationale des Arts et Techniques dans la Vie Moderne in Paris on December 11, 1937, the project, along with other works by Kryachkov, was awarded the 1st degree diploma, a gold medal, and a Grand Prix.

Currently, there are 110 apartments in the building, not 100. In 2008, a monument to Kryachkov was erected in front of the building.

== Notable residents ==
In various years there lived Gersh Budker (physicist), Eugeny Meshalkin (cardiologist), Vladimir Mysh (surgeon), Alexander Tikhonov (biathlete), Yevgeny Mravinsky (conductor), Nikolai Cherkasov (actor), Nikolai Simonov (actor), Vasili Merkuryev (actor). Kryachkov himself, contrary to the popular opinion, never lived in the building.

== Gallery ==
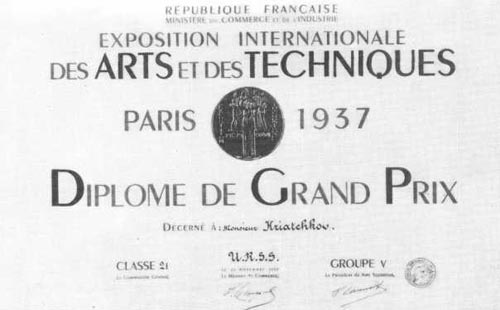
The Grand Prix Diploma of the project (December 11, 1937)

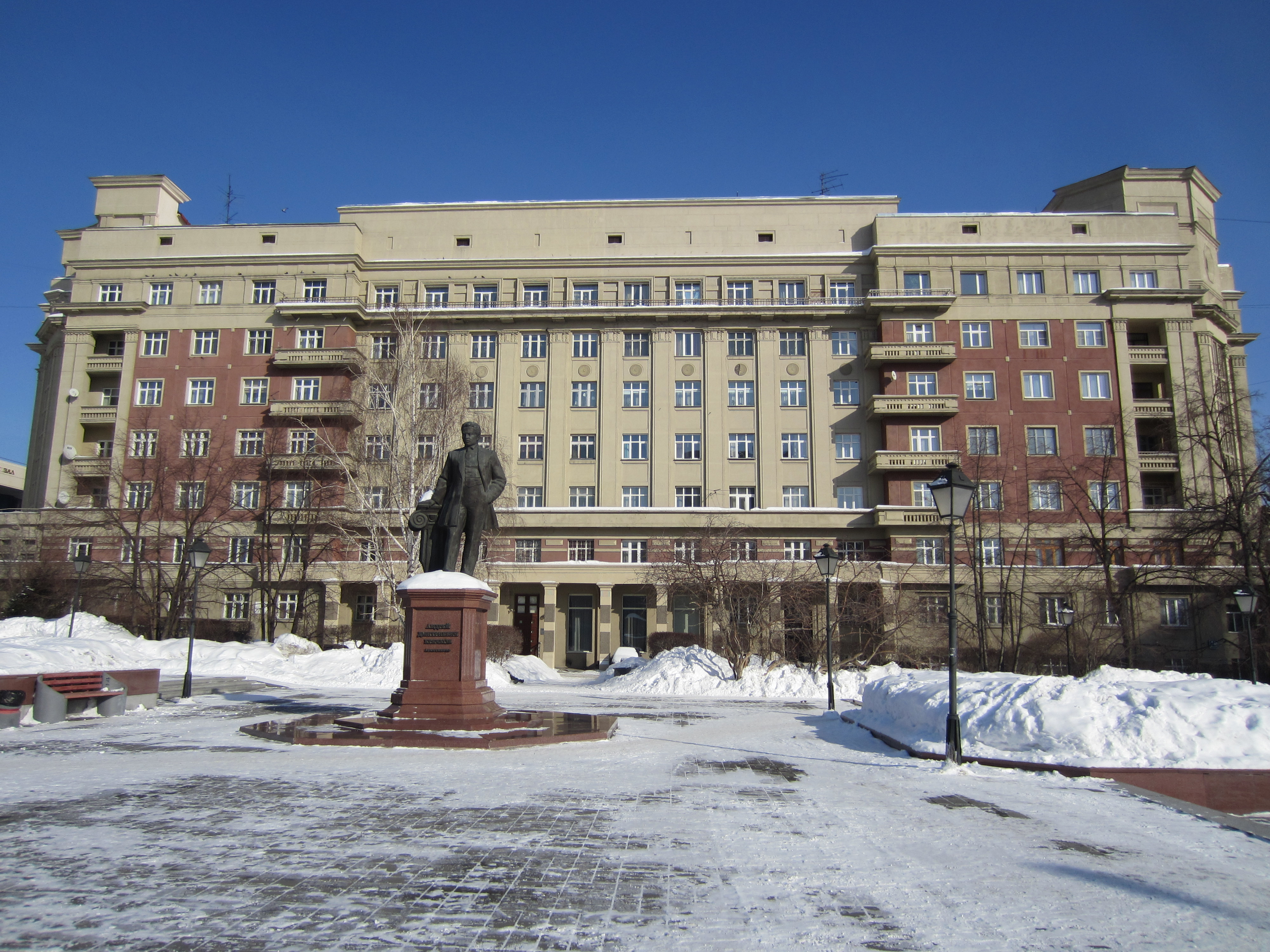
Facade view of the building, with the monument to Kryachkov

== See also ==
- House of Socialist Agriculture
- Oblplan House
- Stanislavsky Street 7
