= Zubra (river) =

Zubra River
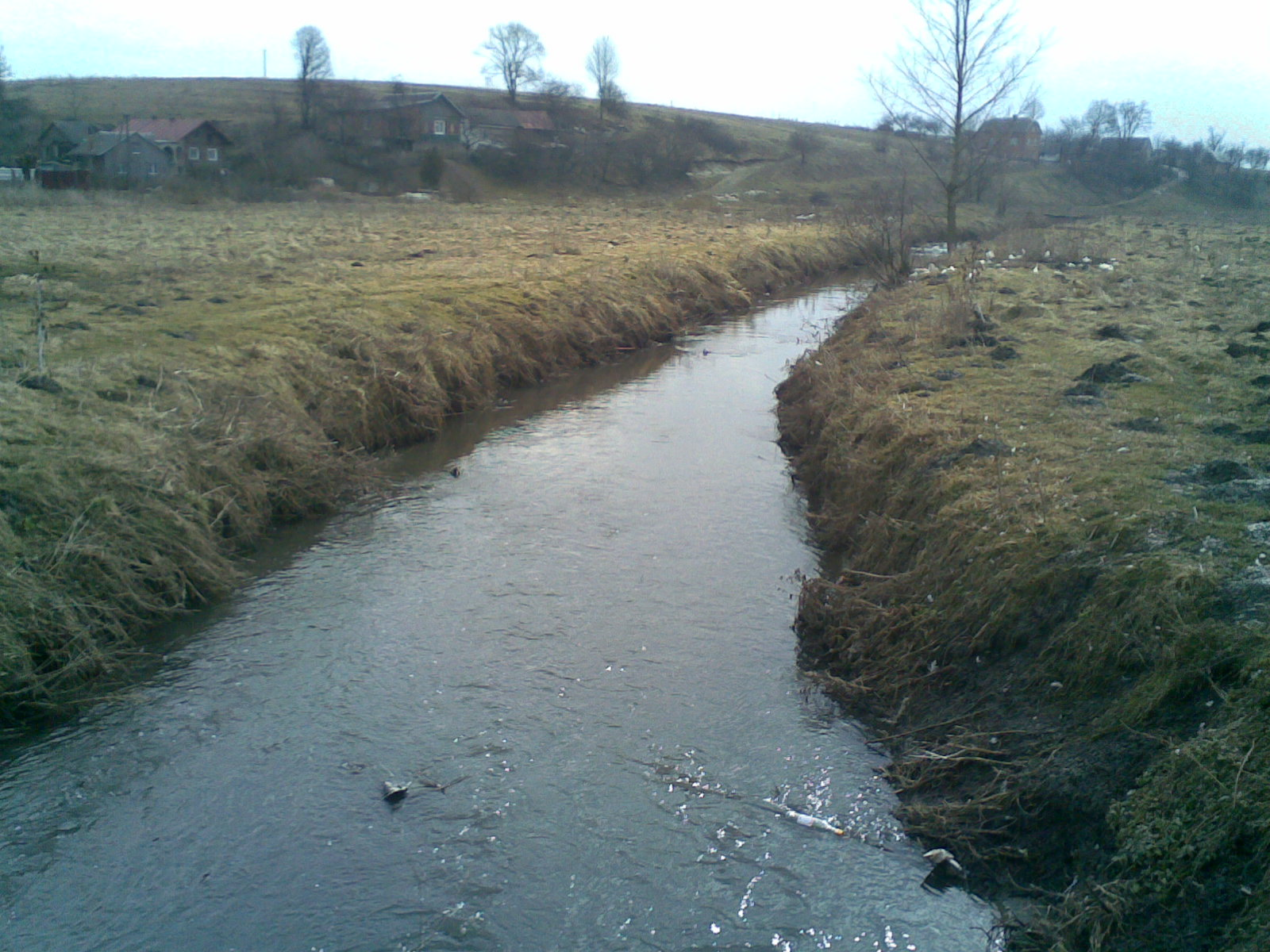

Location
- Country: Ukraine

Physical characteristics
- Source
  - location: Lviv, Ukraine
- Mouth
  - location: Dniester River
  - coordinates: 49°30′47″N 23°56′20″E
- Length: 46 km (29 mi)
- Basin size: 242 km^{2} (93 sq mi)

Basin features
- Progression: Dniester→ Dniester Estuary→ Black Sea

Zubra (Ukrainian: Зубра) or Zubria (Ukrainian: Зубря) is a river in Ukraine, 46 km in length, a left tributary of the Dniester River, the basin of Dniester. The Zubra river finds its source in Southern Lviv.
