= House of Socialist Agriculture =

Building in Novosibirsk, Russia

- Дом Соцземледелия (Russian)
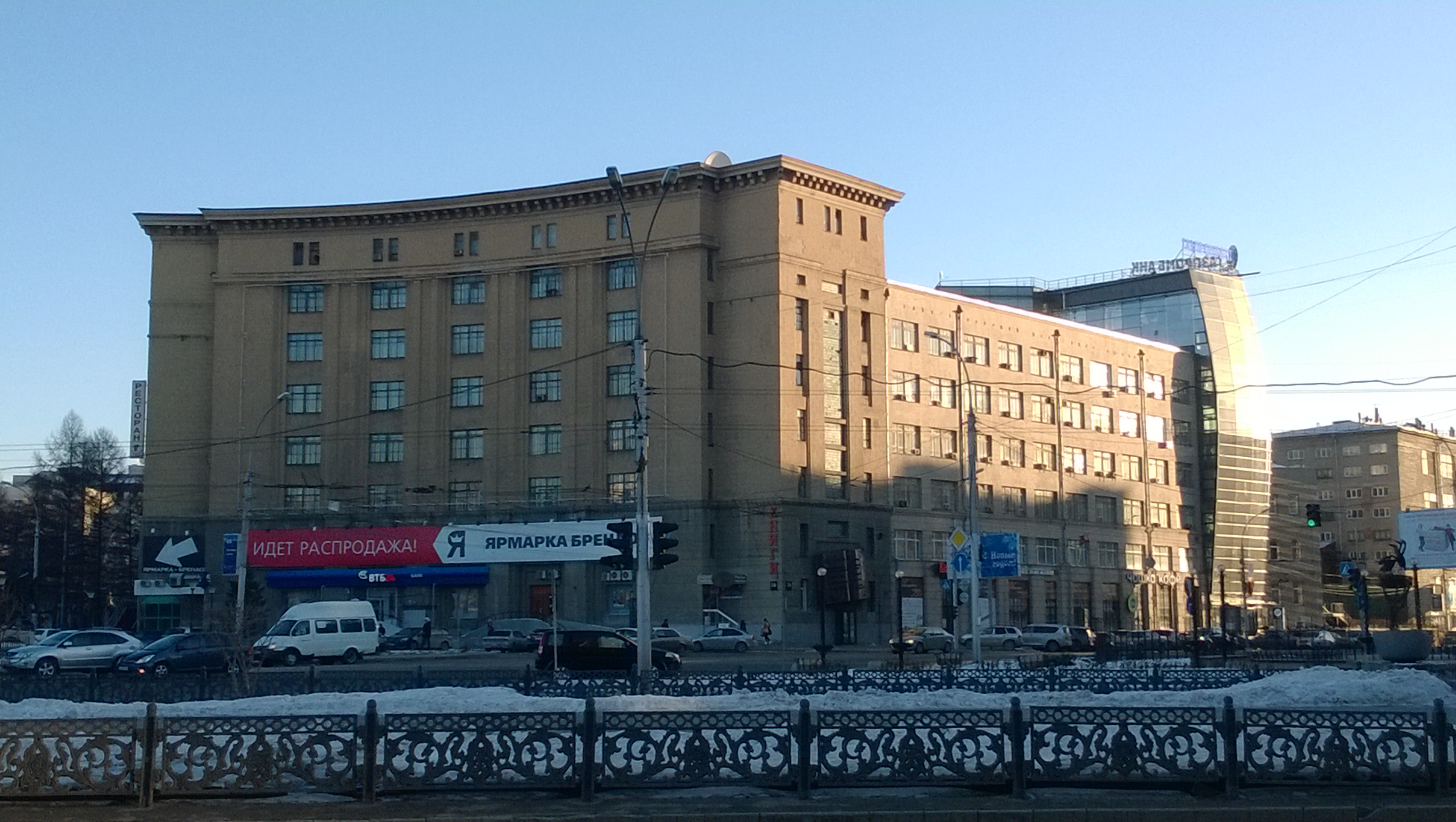
- Interactive map of the House of Socialist Agriculture area

General information
- Location: Maxima Gorkogo Street 78, Novosibirsk, Russia
- Coordinates: 55°01′37″N 82°55′23″E
- Completed: 1936

Design and construction
- Architects: Nikolay Kuzmin; Nikolay Vasilyev

The House of Socialist Agriculture (Russian: Дом Соцземледелия) is a building in Tsentralny City District of Novosibirsk, Russia. It is located between Gorky Street, Oktyabrskaya Magistral and Krasny Avenue. The building was designed by architect Nikolay Kuzmin.

== History ==
The House of Socialist Agriculture was built in 1936. In 1942 Research Institute of Measuring Instruments was located here. It was evacuated to Novosibirsk. In 1952 the building was reconstructed by architect Nikolay Vasilyev.

== Gallery ==
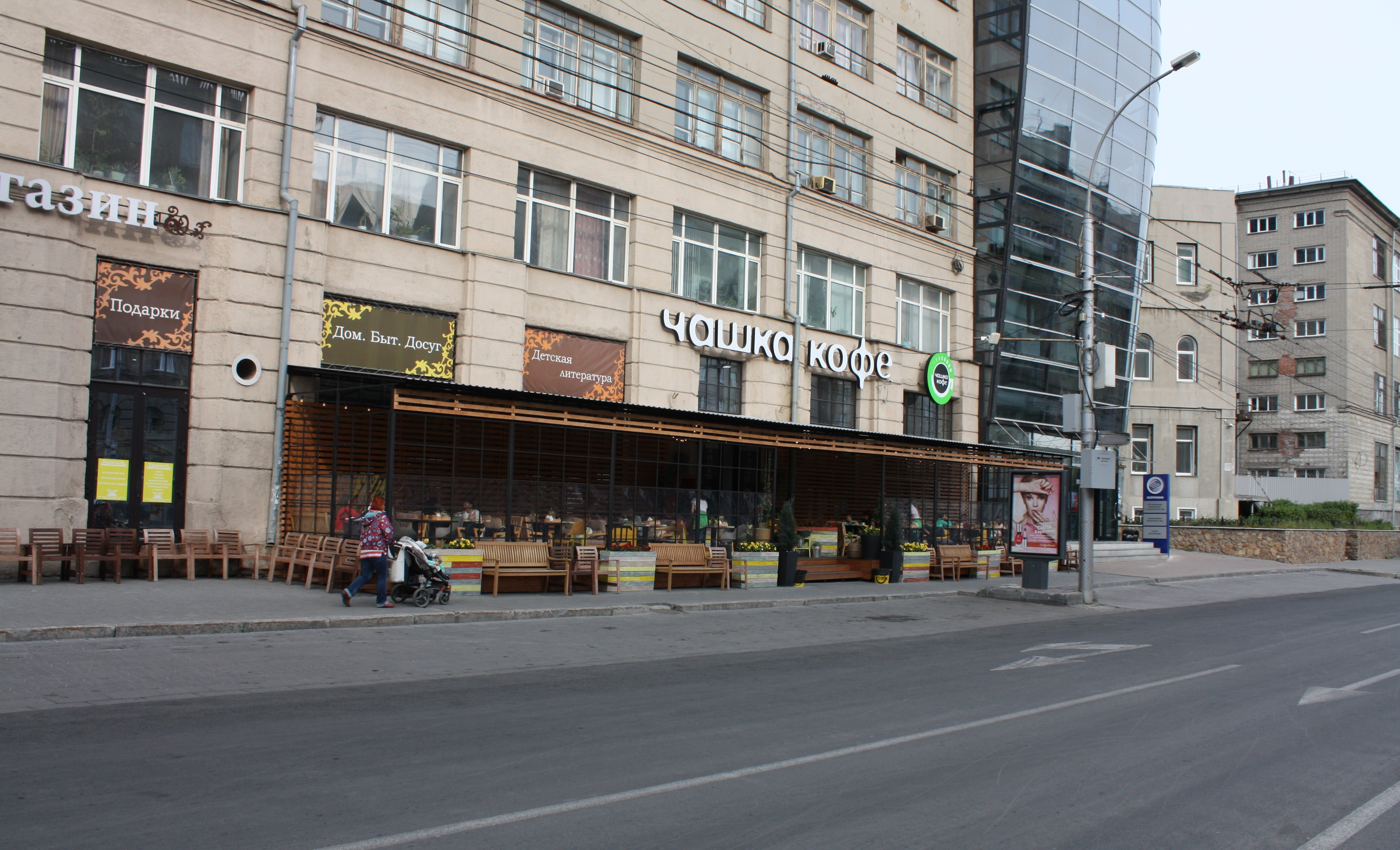

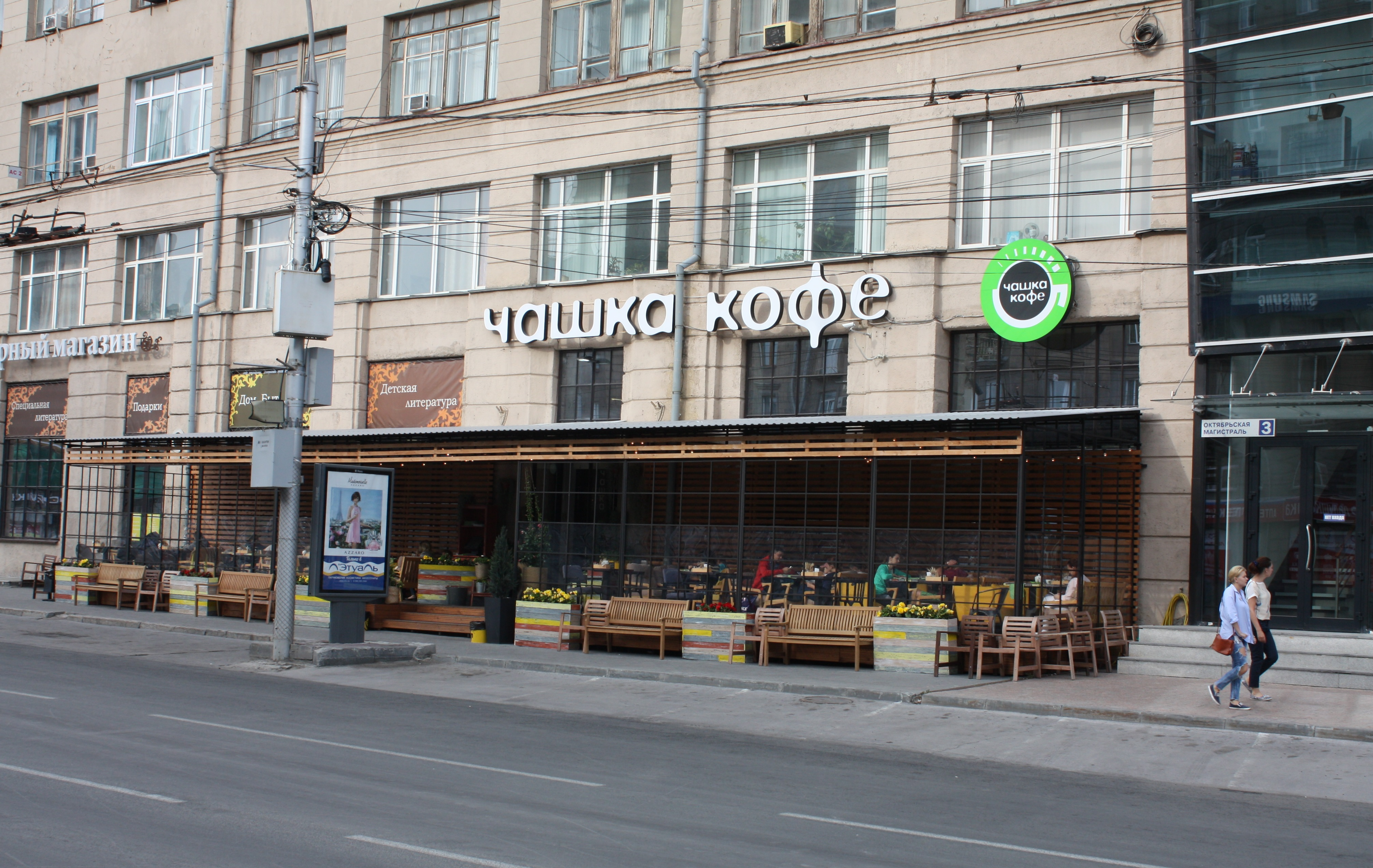

== See also ==
- 100-Flat Building
- Oblplan House
