= Christine Charles =

Australian physicist

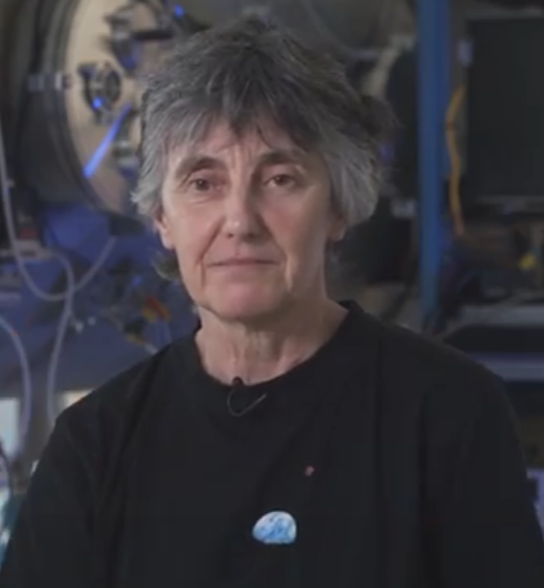
- In an ANU video in 2023
- Born: Brittany, France
- Education: Australian National University
- Occupation: Physicist

Christine Charles FAA is a physicist and the director of the Space Plasma, Power and Propulsion Laboratory at the Australian National University in Canberra, Australia.

Charles is also a inventor, researcher and science communicator.

== Biography ==
Charles was born in Brittany, France, and studied engineering and applied physics at university in France. She completed a Ph. D in plasma physics and a bachelor of music in jazz from the Australian National University. Her specialist field is experimental expanding plasmas (hot ionized gases) and their use in electric propulsion, microelectronics and optoelectronics, astrophysical plasmas, and the development of fuel cells for the hydrogen economy. Charles invented the Helicon Double Layer Thruster, an electrode-less magneto-plasma space engine which could be used for keeping satellite stations in orbit, or interplanetary space travel for humans.

Charles broadcasts and discusses her research through a range of media including television (ABC Catalyst and Discovery Channel), radio and public lectures.

=== Recognition ===
In 2009 Charles received the Australian Institute of Physics Women in Physics Lecturer of the Year Award. In 2011 she was a finalist in the Australian Innovation Challenge and the World Technology Awards. In 2013 she was elected to the American Physical Society. In 2015 she received the Women in Industry Excellence in Engineering Award and was elected to the Australian Academy of Science.
