= Helicon double-layer thruster =

Prototype spacecraft propulsion engine

The helicon double-layer thruster is a prototype electric spacecraft propulsion. It was created by Australian scientist Christine Charles, based on a technology invented by Professor Rod Boswell, both of the Australian National University.

The design has been verified by the ESA, which is participating in its development.

== Theory of operation ==
A helicon double-layer thruster (HDLT) is a type of plasma thruster, which ejects ionized gas at high velocity to provide thrust to a spacecraft. In this thruster design, gas is injected into a tubular chamber (the source tube) with one open end. Radio frequency AC power (at 13.56 MHz in the prototype design) is coupled into a specially shaped antenna wrapped around the chamber. The electromagnetic wave emitted by the antenna causes the gas to break down and form a plasma. The antenna then excites a helicon wave in the plasma, which further heats the plasma.

The device has a roughly constant magnetic field in the source tube (supplied by solenoids in the prototype), but the magnetic field diverges and rapidly decreases in magnitude away from the source region, and might be thought of as a kind of magnetic nozzle. In operation, there is a sharp boundary between the dense plasma inside the source region, and the less dense plasma in the exhaust, which is associated with a sharp change in electrical potential. The plasma properties change rapidly across this boundary, which is known as a current-free electric double layer. The electrical potential is much higher inside the source region than in the exhaust, and this serves both to confine most of the electrons, and to accelerate the ions away from the source region. Enough electrons escape the source region to ensure that the plasma in the exhaust is neutral overall. Like most ion propulsion devices, the HDLT is a low-thrust, high–specific-impulse (high-I_{sp}) thruster.

A prototype 15 cm diameter thruster, operated in low-magnetic-field mode, underwent initial thrust testing in 2010, however, a more complete testing method would be necessary to properly calculate the total thrust. In 2014, the final thruster prototype was undergoing tests at the space simulation facility dubbed "Wombat XL" located at the Australian National University (ANU) Mount Stromlo Observatory.

The HDLT has two main advantages over most other ion thruster designs. First, it creates an accelerating electric field without inserting unreliable components like high-voltage grids into the plasma (the only plasma-facing component is the robust plasma vessel); secondly, a neutralizer is not needed, since there are equal numbers of electrons and (singly charged) positive ions emitted. So, with neither moving mechanical parts nor susceptibility to erosion, Charles explains, 'As long as you provide the power and the propellant you can go forever.'

== Applications ==
The primary application for this thruster design is intended for satellite station-keeping, long-term LEO-to-GEO orbit transfers and deep-space applications. While a typical design could provide a 50-year life span, or a saving of 1,000 pounds (450 kg) of launch weight for large satellites, this type of thruster could also significantly reduce the length of interplanetary space trips. For example, a trip to Mars could be shortened to three months instead of the eight to nine months with conventional chemical rockets.

== See also ==
- Variable Specific Impulse Magnetoplasma Rocket (VASIMR)

== Sources ==
- Plasma thruster tested for Mars mission
- Australia Building Ion Thruster (2012)
- ESA Propulsion Lab
- Plasma Jar to the Stars (2014)
