= Stanislavsky Street 7, Novosibirsk =

Stanislavsky Street 7
- Жилой дом по улице Станиславского, 7
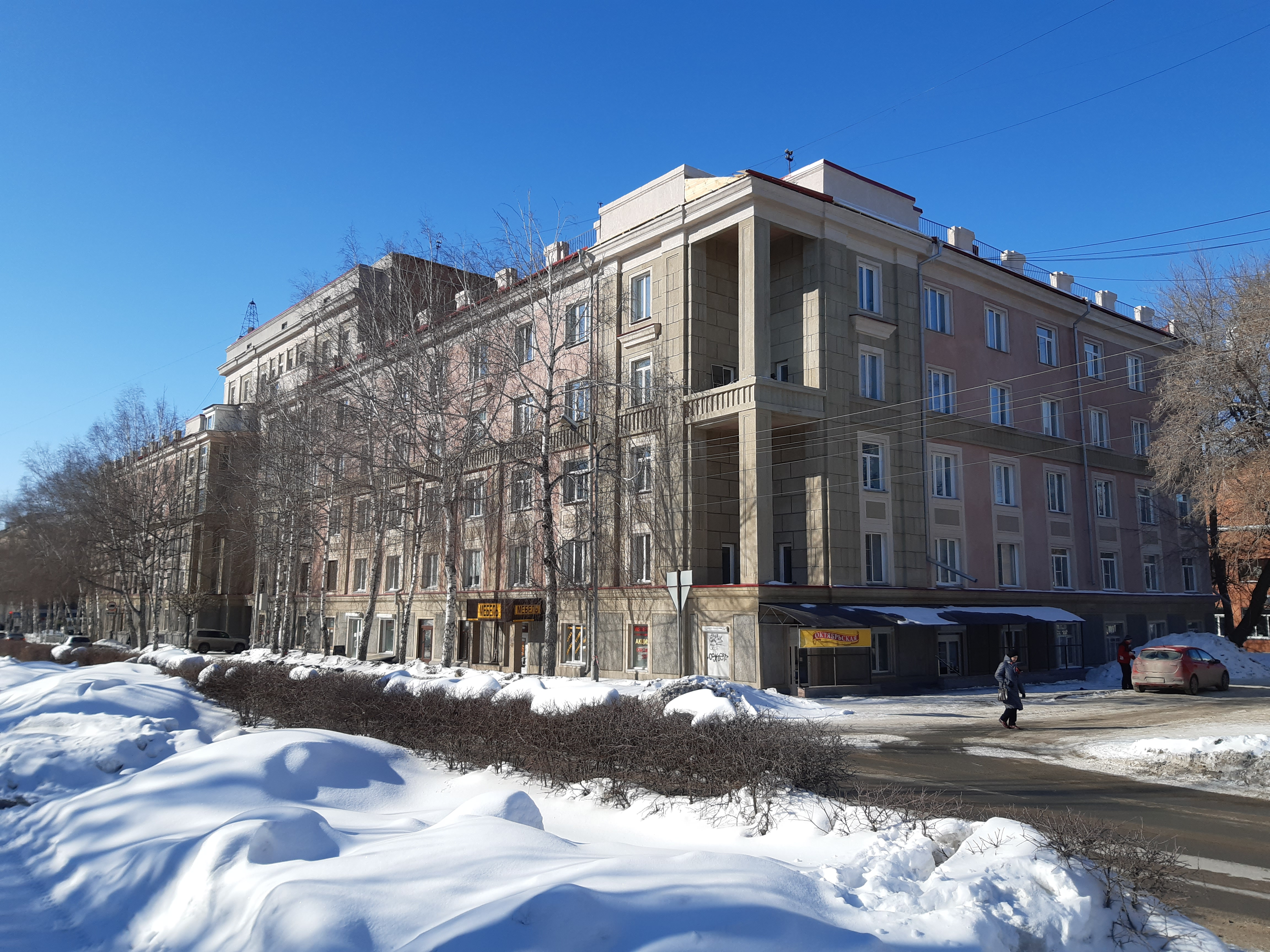
- Interactive map of the Stanislavsky Street 7 area

General information
- Location: Novosibirsk, Russia
- Completed: 1940

Design and construction
- Architects: V. M. Teitel, A. V. Baransky

Stanislavsky Street 7 (Russian: Жилой дом по улице Станиславского, 7) is a residential building in Leninsky District of Novosibirsk, Russia. It was built in 1940. Architects: V. M. Teitel, A. V. Baransky.

== Description ==
Stanislavsky Street 7 is a neoclassical building on the corner of Stanislavsky and Parkhomenko streets.

== Gallery ==
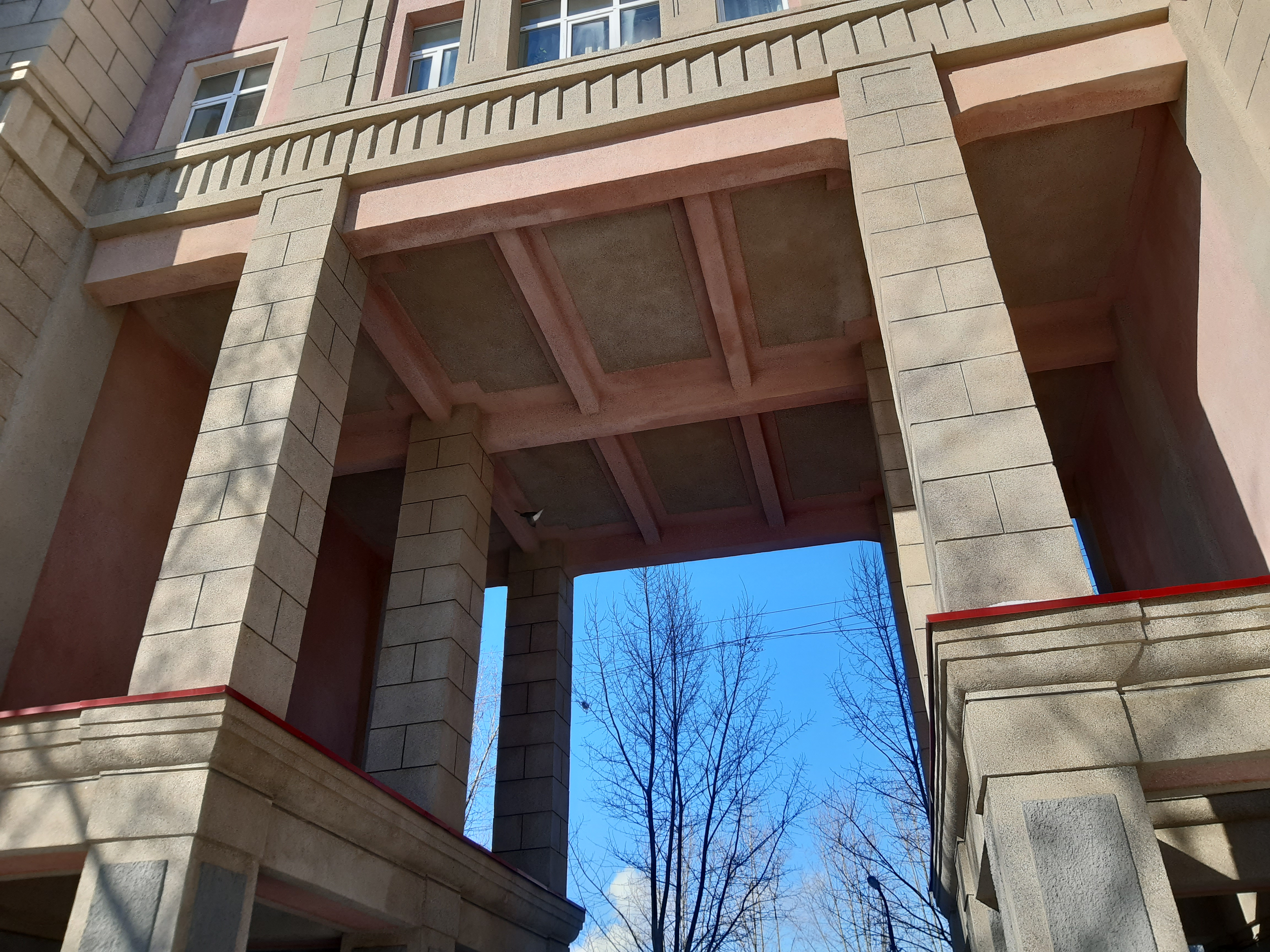

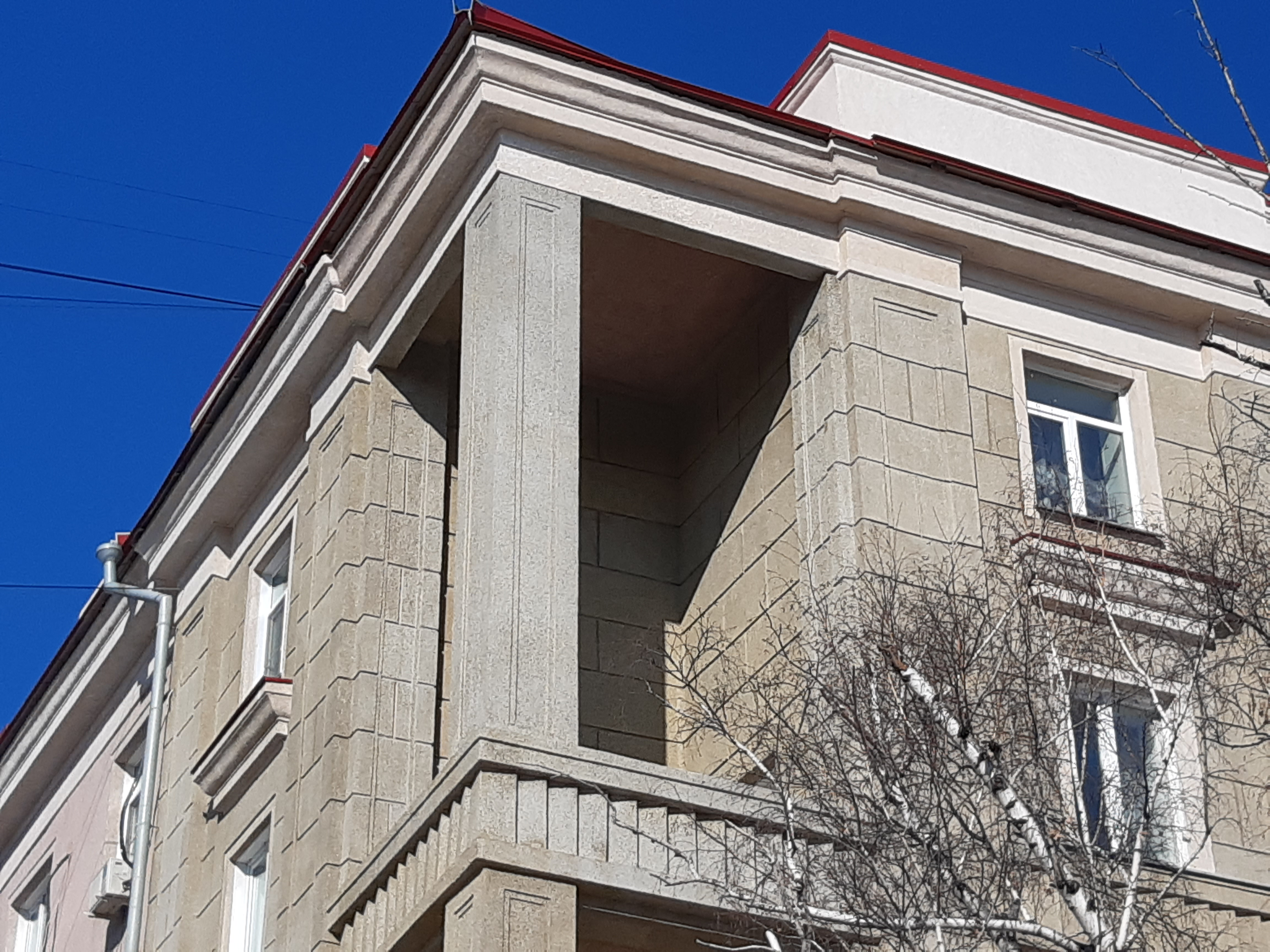

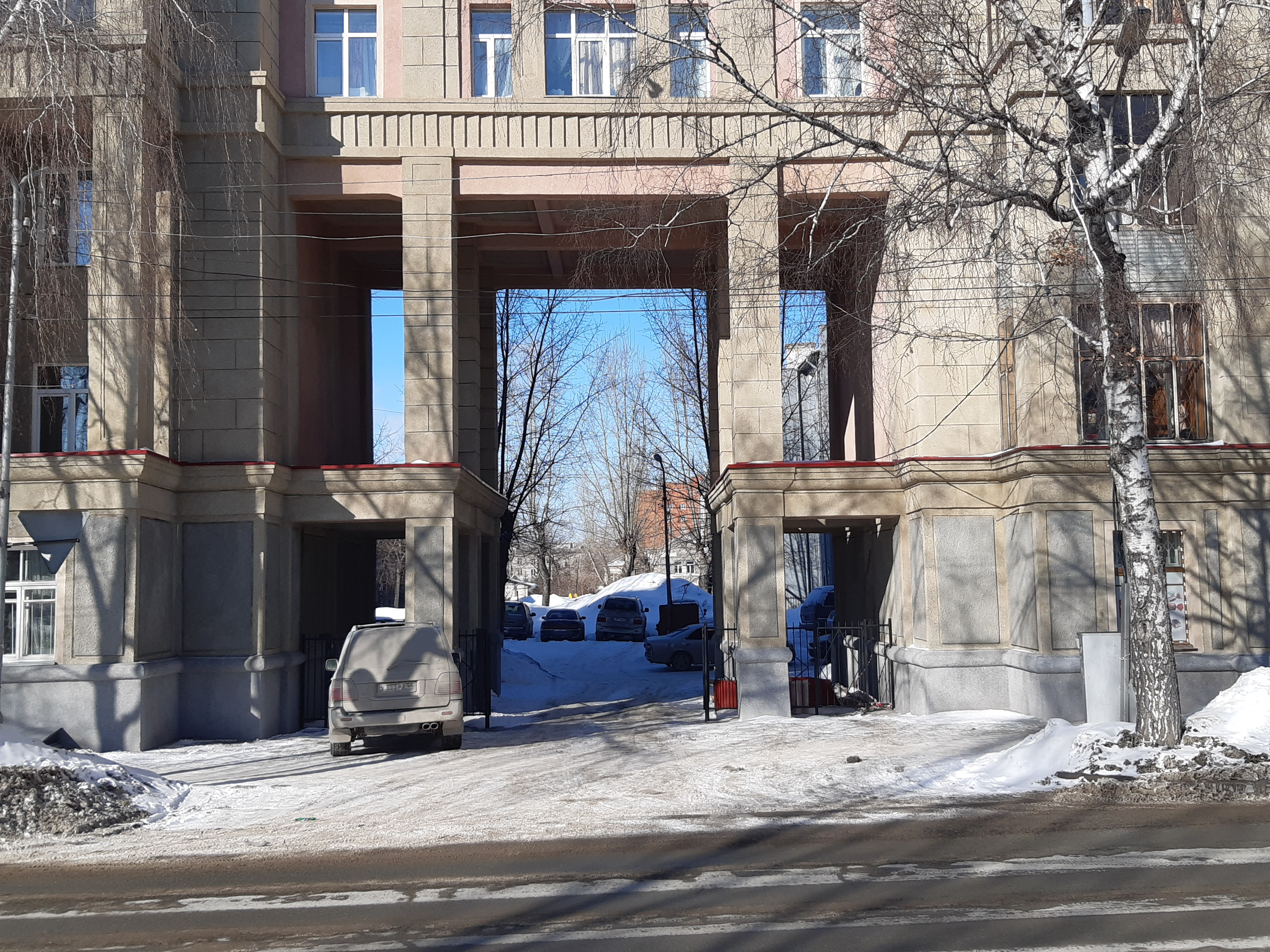

== See also ==
- 100-Flat Building

== Bibliography ==
- Воеводина Т.В., Грес М. В., Минов И. Г. etc. (2011). Памятники истории, архитектуры и монументального искусства Новосибирской области (PDF). Новосибирск: ПК «ДЕАЛ». p. 193. ISBN 5-8402-0368-8.
