= Rod Boswell =

Australian physicist (born 1932)

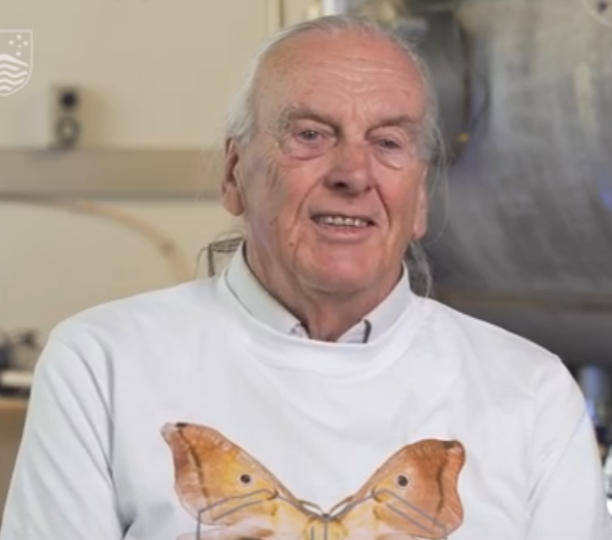
- In an ANU video in 2023
- Born: Roderick William Boswell; 1932 (age 93–94); Yackandandah, Victoria, Australia
- Education: University of Adelaide; Flinders University
- Occupation: Physicist

Roderick William Boswell (born 1932) is an Australian physicist. He is a professor at the Australian National University in Canberra, in the Space Plasma, Power and Propulsion group of the Plasma Research Laboratory. He invented a technology which become the basis for the development of a new type of rocket thruster, the Helicon Double Layer Thruster: the ongoing development of the Australian Plasma Thruster is supported by the European Space Agency.

== Biography ==
Rod Boswell was born in Yackandandah in 1932.

After taking his B.Sc. at the University of Adelaide, he completed a Ph.D. at Flinders University in South Australia. There, in 1969, he was instrumental in establishing the radical student newspaper Empire Times by purchasing and running, in the living room of his home, an offset press, thereby liberating the new newspaper from the censorious tendencies of commercial printers.

His honours and awards include:

- In 2000, he received the Plasma Science & Technology Division Plasma Prize from the American Vacuum Society "for outstanding scientific and technical contributions to the fields of plasma science and technology."
- In 2001 he was awarded a Centenary Medal "for service to Australian society in applied physics".
- In 2008 he was elected a Fellow of the Australian Academy of Science
- In 2012 he was appointed a Member of the Order of Australia (AM) "for service to science in the field of plasma physics as an academic and researcher and through contributions to the international scientific community".
