= Dniester =

River in Eastern Europe

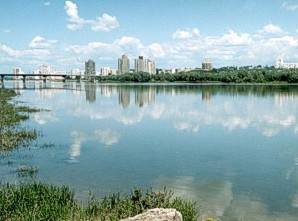
- Rîbnița and the Dniester river

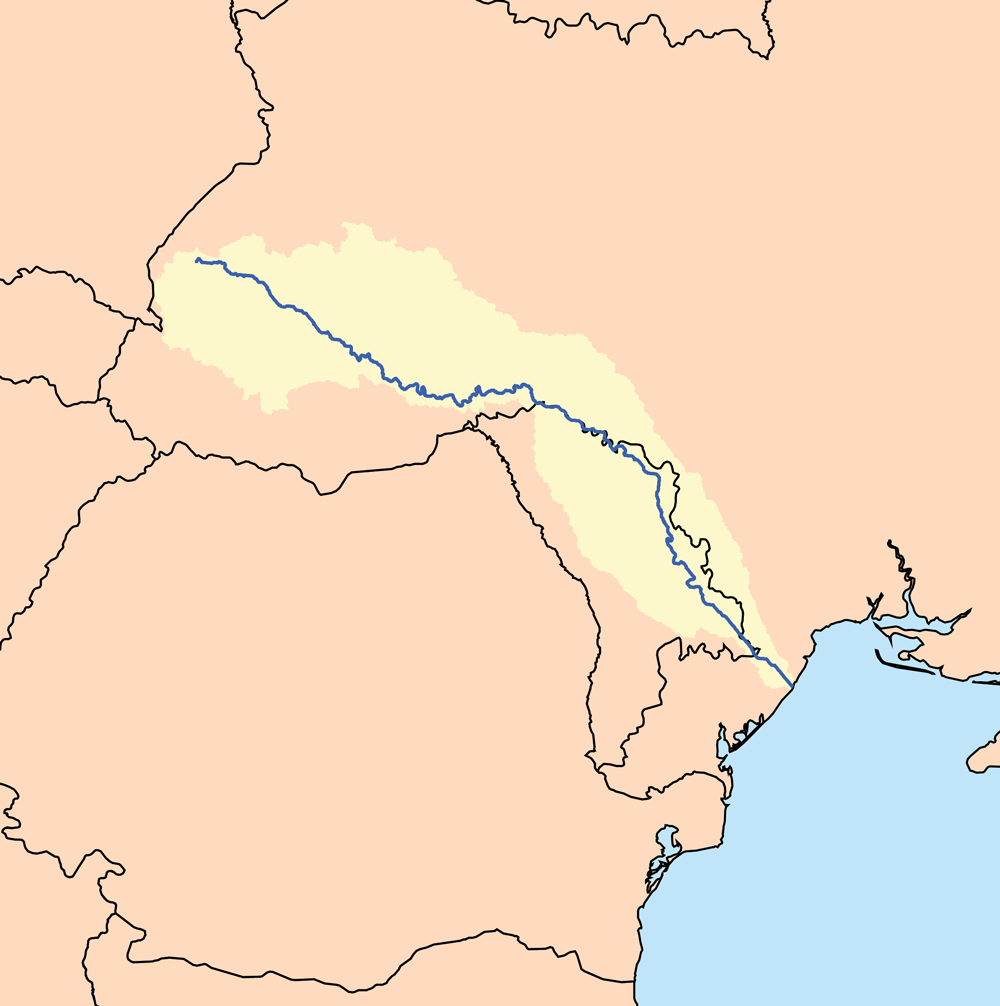
- Map of the Dniester basin

Location
- Country: Ukraine; Moldova (incl. Transnistria)
- Cities: Staryi Sambir; Sambir; Halych; Khotyn; Mohyliv-Podilskyi; Soroca; Rîbnița; Dubăsari; Bender (Tighina); Tiraspol; Bilhorod-Dnistrovskyi

Physical characteristics
- Source
  - location: Eastern Beskids (Ukrainian Carpathians)
  - coordinates: 49°12′44″N 22°55′40″E
  - elevation: 900 m (3,000 ft)
- Mouth: Black Sea
  - location: Odesa Oblast
  - coordinates: 46°21′0″N 30°14′0″E
  - elevation: 0 m (0 ft)
- Length: 1,362 km (846 mi)
- Basin size: 68,627 km^{2} (26,497 sq mi)
- Discharge
  - average: 310 m^{3}/s (11,000 cu ft/s)

Basin features
- Tributaries
  - left: Murafa, Smotrych, Zbruch, Seret, Strypa, Zolota Lypa, Stryi
  - right: Botna, Bîc, Răut, Svicha, Lomnytsia, Ichel

Ramsar Wetland
- Official name: Lower Dniester
- Designated: 20 August 2003
- Reference no.: 1316

Ramsar Wetland
- Official name: Dnister River Valley
- Designated: 20 March 2019
- Reference no.: 2388

The Dniester (/ˈniːstər/ NEE-stər) (Note: Ukrainian: Дністер, romanized: Dnister, IPA: [d⁽ʲ⁾n⁽ʲ⁾iˈstɛr]; Romanian: Nistru; Russian: Днестр, romanized: Dnestr, IPA: [dnʲestr]; Polish: Dniestr; Ancient Greek: Τύρᾱς, romanized: Tyrās, IPA: [týraːs]; Latin: Tyrās, IPA: [ˈtʏraːs], or Danaster, IPA: [daˈnaːstɛr].) is a transboundary river in Eastern Europe. It runs first through Ukraine and then through Moldova (from which it more or less separates the breakaway territory of Transnistria), finally discharging into the Black Sea on Ukrainian territory again.

== Names ==
The name Dniester derives from Sarmatian dānu nazdya "the close river". (The Dnieper, also of Sarmatian origin, derives from the opposite meaning, "the river on the far side".) Alternatively, according to Vasily Abaev Dniester would be a blend of Scythian dānu "river" and Thracian Ister, the previous name of the river, literally Dān-Ister (River Ister). The Ancient Greek name of Dniester, Tyras (Τύρας), is from Scythian tūra, meaning "rapid".

The names of the Don and Danube are also from the same Iranian word *dānu "river". Classical authors have also referred to it as Danaster. These early forms, without -i- but with -a-, contradict Abaev's hypothesis. Edward Gibbon refers to the river both as the Niester and Dniester in his History of the Decline and Fall of the Roman Empire.

In Ukrainian, it is known as Дністе́р (translit. Dnister), in Romanian as Nistru, in Russian as Днестр (translit. Dnestr), in Bulgarian as Днестър (translit. Dnestar), in Polish as Dniestr, in Yiddish as Nester נעסטער; in Turkish as Turla (Ottoman Turkish: طورلا ، طورله), and in Lithuanian as Dniestras.

== Geography ==
The Dniester rises in Ukraine, near the city of Turka, close to the border with Poland, and flows toward the Black Sea. Its course marks part of the border of Ukraine and Moldova, after which it flows through Moldova for 398 kilometres (247 mi), separating the main territory of Moldova from its breakaway region Transnistria. It later forms an additional part of the Moldova-Ukraine border, then flows through Ukraine to the Black Sea, where its estuary forms the Dniester Liman.

Along the lower half of the Dniester, the western bank is high and hilly while the eastern one is low and flat. The river represents the de facto end of the Eurasian Steppe. Its most important tributaries are Răut and Bîc.

== History ==
During the Neolithic, the Dniester River was the centre of one of the most advanced civilizations on earth at the time. The Cucuteni–Trypillian culture flourished in this area from roughly 5300 to 2600 BC, leaving behind thousands of archeological sites. Their settlements had up to 15,000 inhabitants, making them among the first large farming communities in the world.

In antiquity, the river was considered one of the principal rivers of European Sarmatia, and it was mentioned by many Classical geographers and historians. According to Herodotus (iv.51) it rose in a large lake, whilst Ptolemy (iii.5.17, 8.1 &c.) places its sources in Mount Carpates (the modern Carpathian Mountains), and Strabo (ii) says that they are unknown. It ran in an easterly direction parallel with the Ister (lower Danube), and formed part of the boundary between Dacia and Sarmatia. It fell into the Pontus Euxinus to the northeast of the mouth of the Ister, the distance between them being 900 stadia – approximately 210 km (130 mi) – according to Strabo (vii.), while 210 km (130 mi) (from the Pseudostoma) according to Pliny (iv. 12. s. 26). Scymnus (Fr. 51) describes it as of easy navigation, and abounding in fish. Ovid (ex Pont. iv.10.50) speaks of its rapid course.

Greek authors referred to the river as Tyras (Greek: ὁ Τύρας). At a later period it obtained the name of Danastris or Danastus, whence its modern name of Dniester (Niester), though the Turks still called it Turla during the 19th century. The form Τύρις is sometimes found.

It formed the northeastern border of the Bulgarian Empire in the 7th-10th centuries. According to Constantine VII, the Varangians used boats on their trade route from the Varangians to the Greeks, along Dniester and Dnieper and along the Black Sea shore. The navigation near the western shore of Black Sea contained stops at Aspron (at the mouth of Dniester), then Conopa, Constantia (localities today in Romania) and Messembria (today in Bulgaria).

From the 14th century to 1812, part of the Dniester formed the eastern boundary of the Principality of Moldavia.

Between the World Wars, the Dniester formed part of the boundary between Romania and the Soviet Union. In 1919, on Easter Sunday, the bridge was blown up by the French Army to protect Bender from the Bolsheviks. During World War II, German and Romanian forces battled Soviet troops on the western bank of the river.

After the Republic of Moldova declared its independence in 1991, the small area to the east of the Dniester that had been part of the Moldavian SSR refused to participate and declared itself the Pridnestrovian Moldavian Republic, or Transnistria, with its capital at Tiraspol on the river.

In Moldova, the Dniester Day (Romanian: Ziua Nistrului) is celebrated every year in the last Sunday of May.

== Tributaries ==
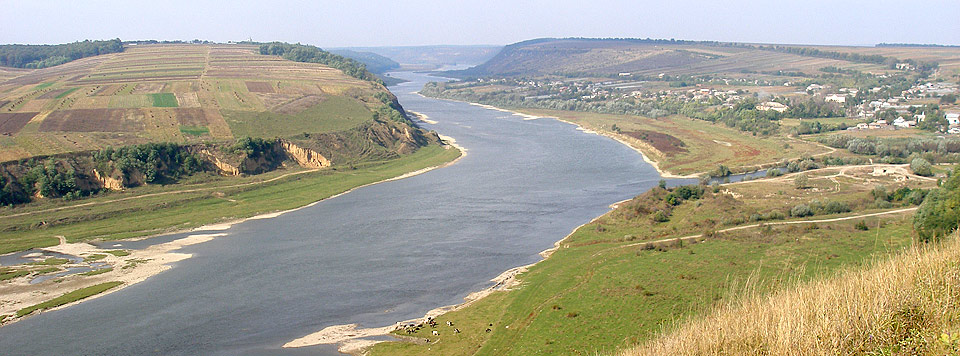
At the confluence of the Seret and the Dniester.

From source to mouth, right tributaries, i.e. on the southwest side, are the Stryi (231 km or 144 mi), Svicha (107 km or 66 mi), Limnytsia (122 km or 76 mi), Bystrytsia (101 km), Răut (283 km or 176 mi), Ichel (101 km or 63 mi), Bîc (155 km or 96 mi), and Botna (152 km or 94 mi).

Left tributaries, on the northeast side, are the Strviazh (94 km or 58 mi), Zubra, Hnyla Lypa (87 km or 54 mi), Zolota Lypa (140 km or 87 mi), Koropets (78 km or 48 mi), Strypa (147 km or 91 mi), Seret (250 km or 160 mi), Zbruch (245 km or 152 mi), Smotrych (169 km or 105 mi), Ushytsia (122 km or 76 mi), Zhvanchyk (107 km or 66 mi), Liadova (93 km or 58 mi), Murafa (162 km or 101 mi), Rusava (78 km or 48 mi), Yahorlyk (73 km or 45 mi), and Kuchurhan (123 km or 76 mi).

== Eco-TIRAS International Environmental Association of River Keepers ==
Eco-TIRAS International Environmental Association of River Keepers was established in 1999 in Moldova. It was founded by environmental NGOs from Moldova and Ukraine, specifically those operating within the Dniester River basin. The organization's primary goal is to promote the sustainable management of the Dniester River's water resources through the Integrated River Basin Management approach. Eco-TIRAS was registered with the Ministry of Justice of Moldova on 14 January 2000. Its founder and executive director is ecologist Ilia Trombițchi.

== Gallery ==
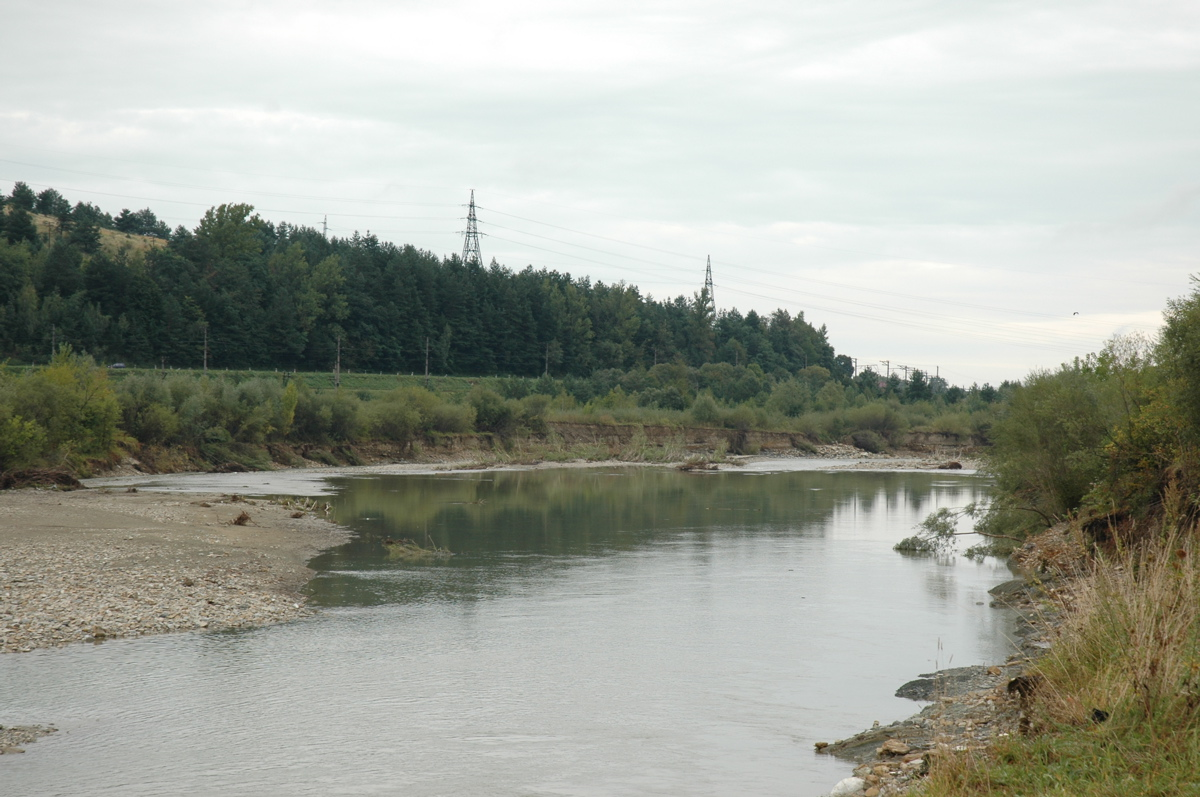
Dnister's riverhead in Staryi Sambir (western Ukraine)

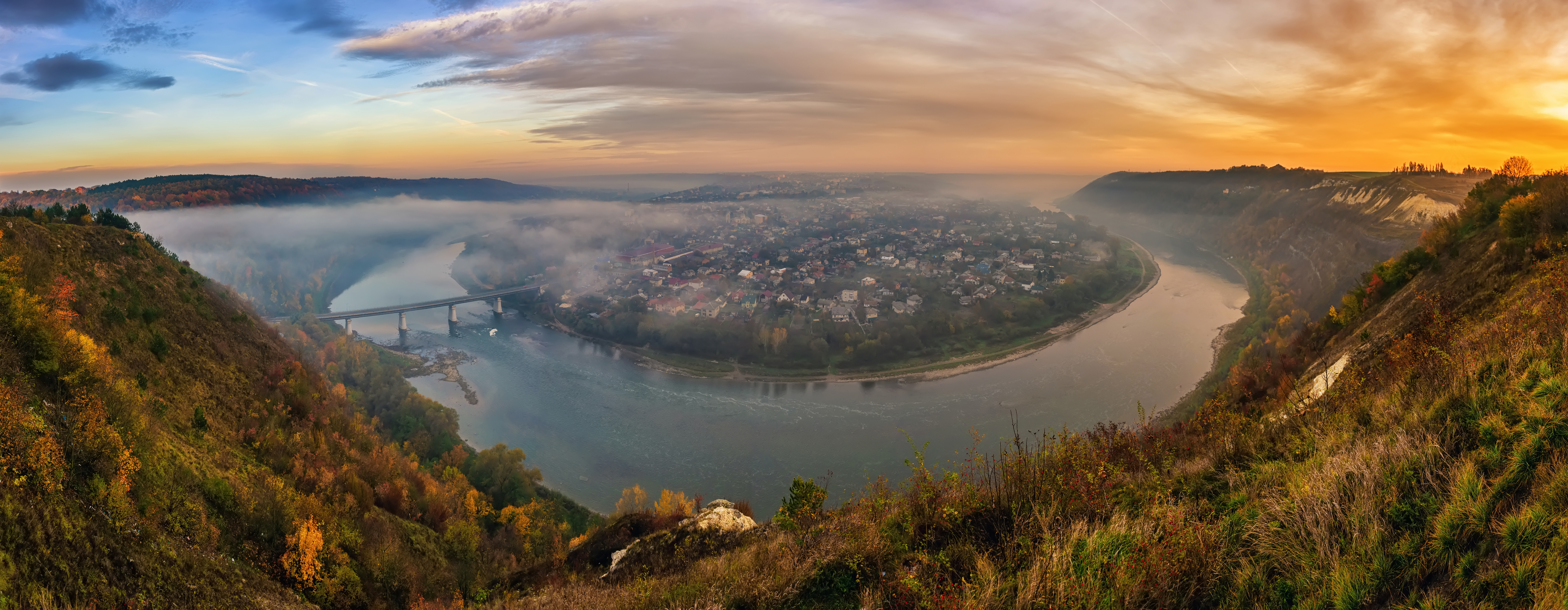
Dnister Canyon in Zalishchyky

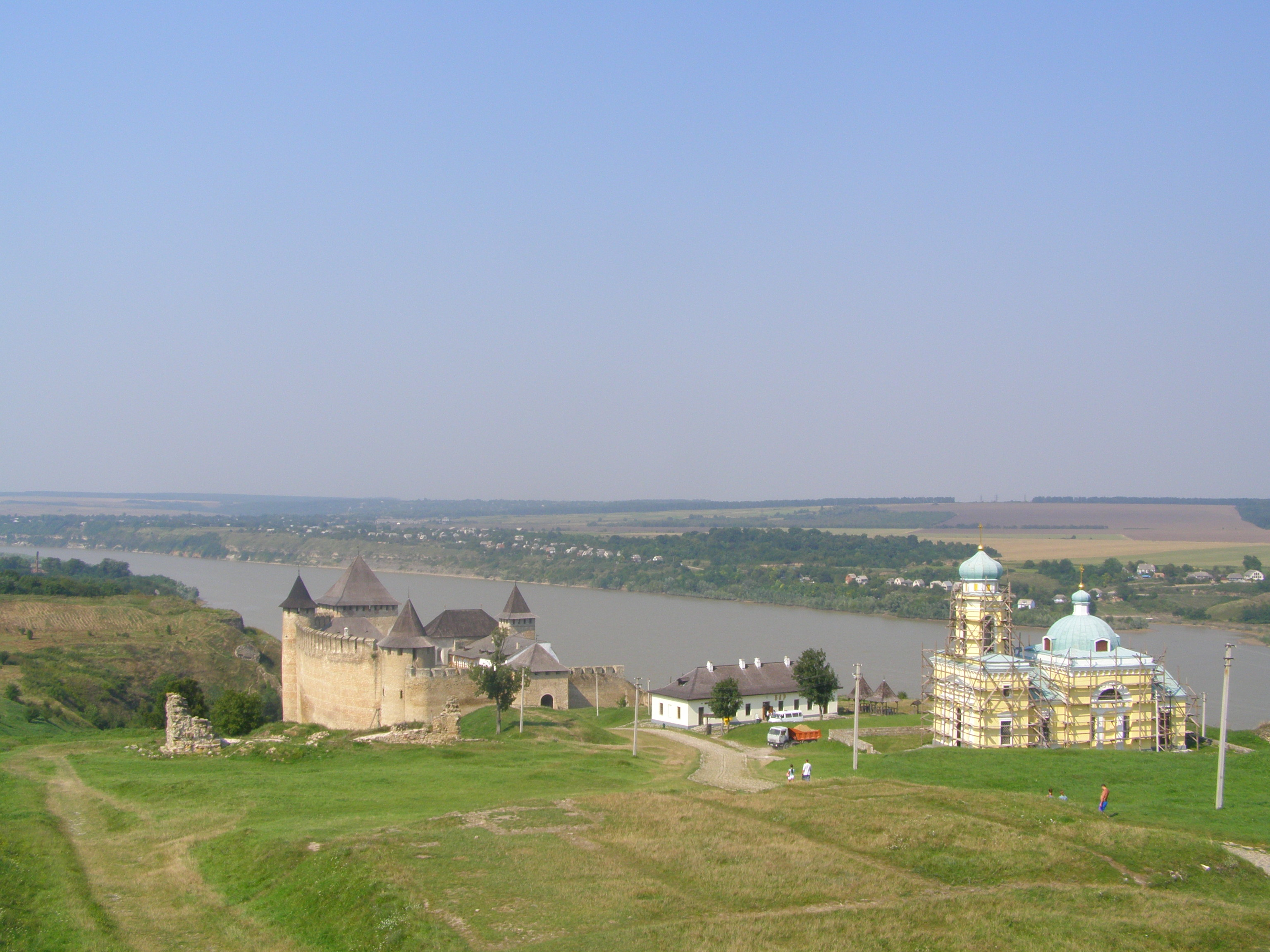
The Dniester in Khotyn

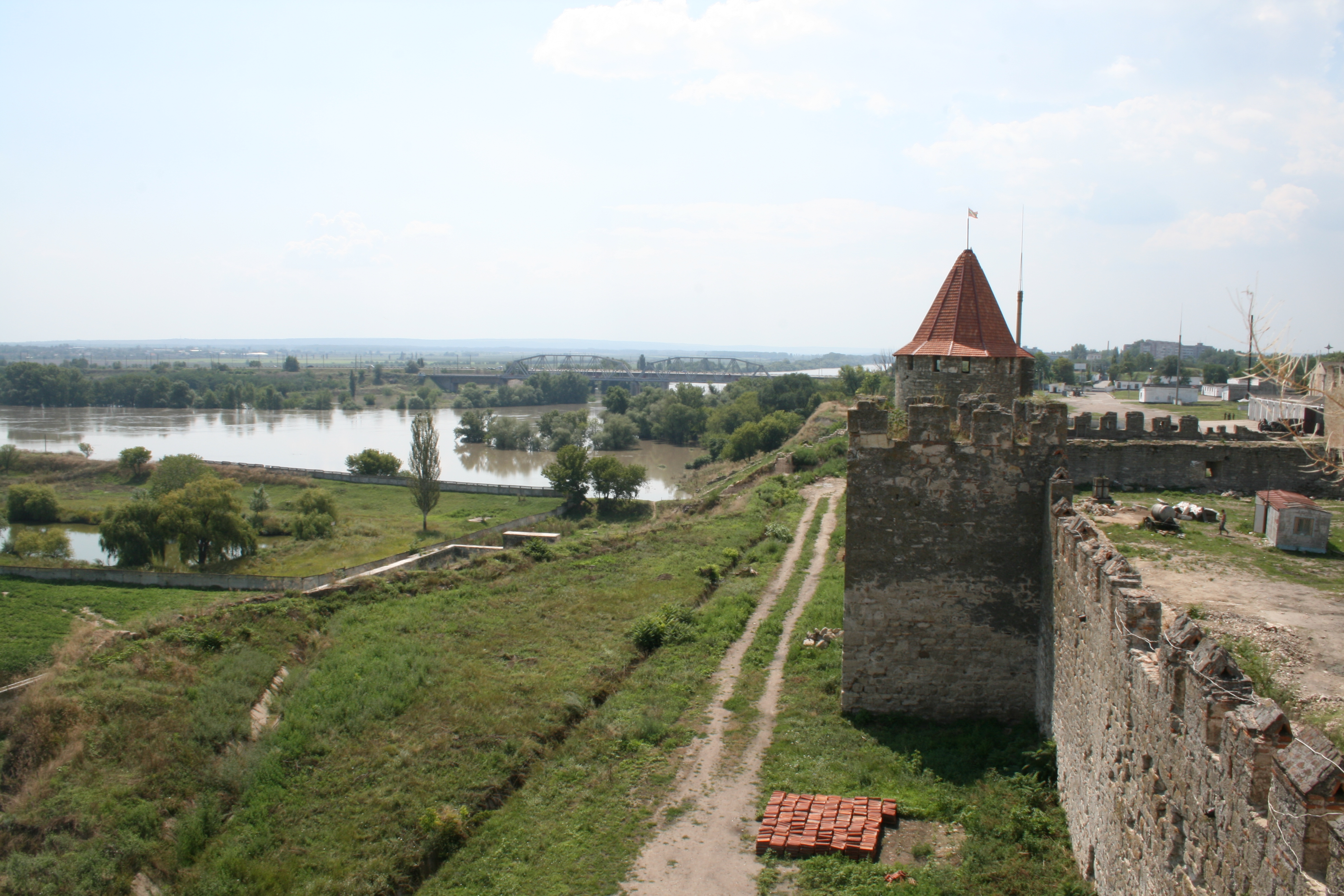
The Dniester at the Moldavian fortress of Tighina

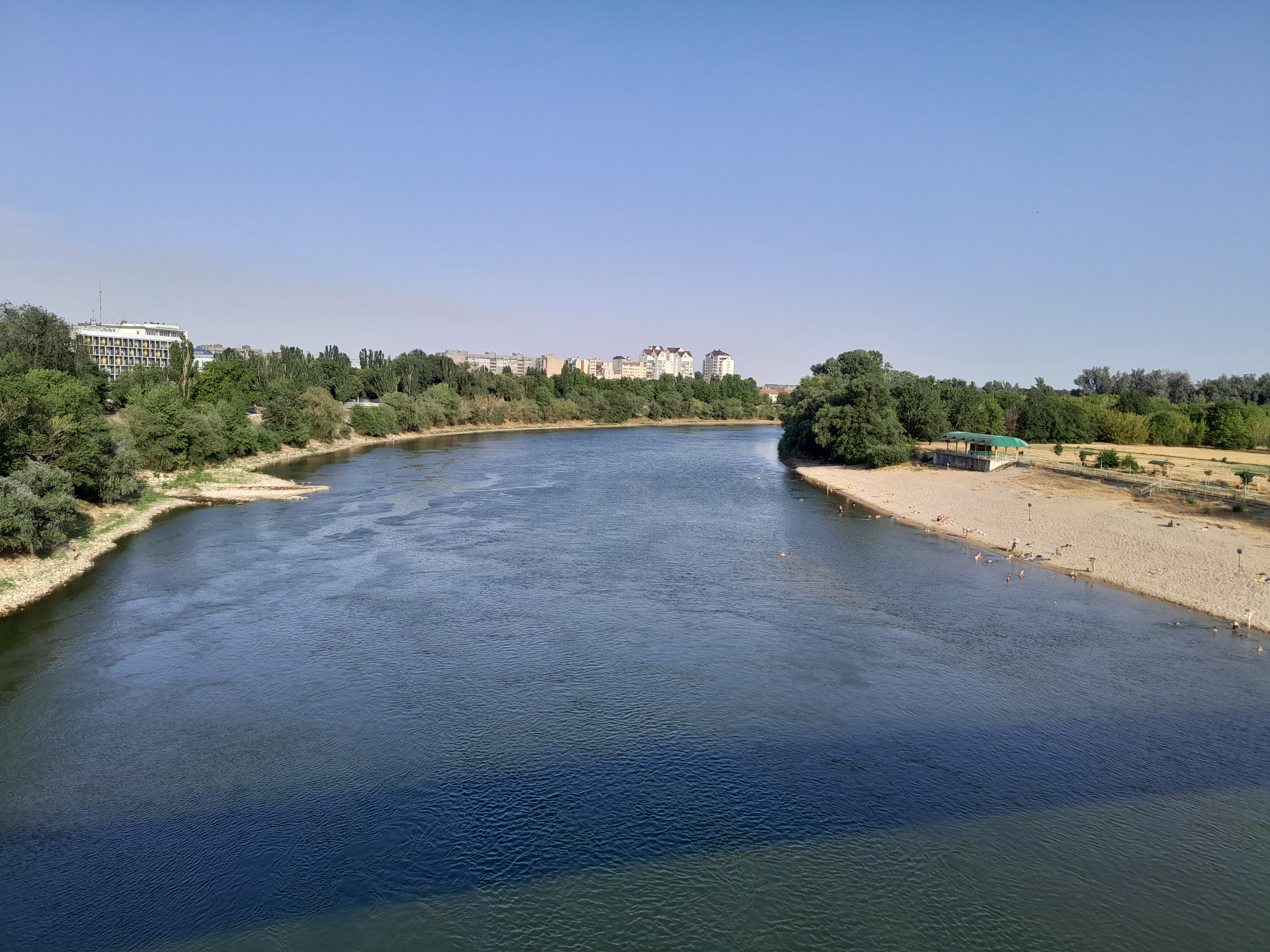
Beach on Dniester, in Tiraspol, July 2025

== See also ==
- Dniester Canyon
- Dniester Pumped Storage Power Station
- Euroregion Dniester
