= Ad Astra Rocket Company =

American rocket propulsion company

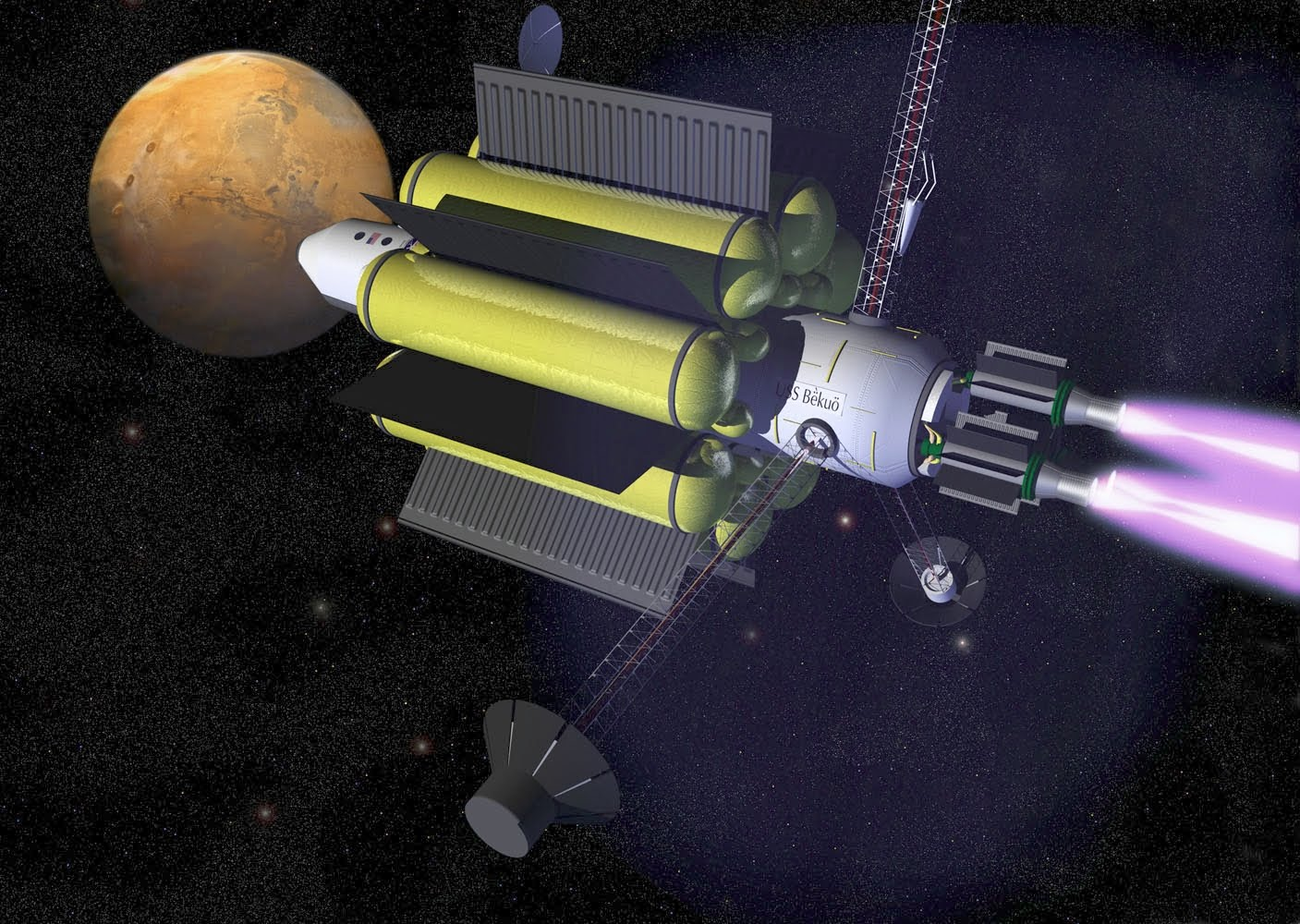
- Artist's impression of several VASIMR engines propelling a craft through space
- Industry: Defence industry
- Products: Spacecraft propulsion
- Website: www.adastrarocket.com

The Ad Astra Rocket Company, a U.S. Delaware corporation, is a rocket propulsion company dedicated to the development of advanced plasma rocket propulsion technology. Located in Webster, Texas, three miles away from NASA's Johnson Space Center, and in Liberia, Costa Rica, the company was incorporated on January 14, 2005. The President and CEO of Ad Astra Rocket Company is retired astronaut Franklin Chang-Díaz. The company has been working on Chang-Díaz's concept of the Variable Specific Impulse Magnetoplasma Rocket, known by its acronym VASIMR. The VASIMR is intended to achieve several advantages over chemical rocket designs, including lunar cargo transport, in-space refueling, and ultra-high speeds for distant space missions.

The Ad Astra Rocket Company Costa Rica (AARC CR) is a wholly owned subsidiary of Ad Astra Rocket Company. AARC CR was formed in 2005. The facility is located approximately 10 km west of the city of Liberia, capital of the province of Guanacaste, on the campus of EARTH University. On December 13, 2006, the Costa Rican team of AARC generated its first plasma. After extensive testing of a 200 kW ground-test VASIMR unit, the company is aiming for a three-year flight test mission.

In March 2015, NASA selected Ad Astra for the NextSTEP program. The partnership was still continuing as of July 2021, with Ad Astra aiming to achieve the NASA-set goal of firing VASIMR continuously for 100 hours at 100 kilowatts in the second half of 2021.

== History ==
The VASIMR is an advanced rocket design that uses plasma for rocket propulsion. Chang-Díaz conceived the VASIMR in 1979, shortly following his graduate research in fusion and plasma-based rocket propulsion at the Massachusetts Institute of Technology. After being selected as an astronaut in 1980, Chang-Díaz served on seven different shuttle missions, a space record that he shares with astronaut Jerry L. Ross. After retiring in 2005 from NASA, Chang-Díaz formed Ad Astra Rocket Company to develop and commercialize the VASIMR technology.

Ad Astra completed a formal Preliminary Design Review (PDR) on the VF-200 engine with NASA in June 2013. This was the first design milestone on the path to flying a VF-200 on the ISS.

August 1st, 2024: NASA recently delivered $10 million in funding to Ad Astra Rocket Company of Texas for further development of its Variable Specific Impulse Magnetoplasma Rocket (VASIMR), an electromagnetic thruster capable of propelling a spaceship to Mars in just 39 days. NASA's funding was part of the "12 Next Space Technologies for Exploration Partnership." Ad Astra's rocket will travel ten times quicker than chemical rockets while using one-tenth the amount of fuel.

== 200 kW engine ==
Ad Astra Rocket Company developed the VX-200, a full-scale prototype of the VASIMR engine intended for ground testing. The company successfully tested the prototype in September 2009. Following the test, the company began preparations for the VF-200, the first flight unit. The VASIMR technology could be useful in the near future for interplanetary space travel. The VASIMR design would be capable of reducing the trip from Earth to Mars to less than four months, whereas chemical rockets would take around eight months for one-way transit, making the round-trip mission longer than 2 years. A nuclear-powered VASIMR engine could shorten the round-trip in-flight time into under five months, while smaller scale solar powered engines could tug satellites through different orbits and deliver loads to the moon.

As of October 2010, the company is aiming to offer the technology for space tug missions to help "clean up the ever-growing problem of space trash."

As of July 2012, a recent test phase of the VX-200 has demonstrated a ten percent increase in efficiency at intermediate levels of specific impulse, indicating that an operational version would both increase payload mass and decrease trip times. The "efficiency improvements were achieved through design improvements in critical engine components, 'fine-tuning' the radio-frequency power system settings, and upgrades to the software that controls the engine during startup and firing."

As of June 2013, Ad Astra completed a formal Preliminary Design Review (PDR) on the VF-200 engine, as a critical milestone on the development pathway to testing the VF-200 on a multi-month test on the International Space Station.

By July 2021, Ad Astra had completed multiple long-duration engine firings on the upgraded VF-200SS engine, with a continuous firing of 100 hours at 100 KW planned as the last test before testing in space, which could occur as early as 2023.
