= Boris Breizman =

Russian-American physicist

Boris N. Breizman
- Occupations: Russian-American theoretical physicist, Research Professor in the Department of Physics at the University of Texas at Austin
- Known for: working on plasma physics

Boris N. Breizman is a Russian-American theoretical physicist working on plasma physics. His research primarily focuses on linear and nonlinear wave dynamics in plasmas, with applications in magnetic confinement fusion, beam-plasma interactions, space plasmas, and advanced plasma-based propulsion systems. He currently serves as a Research Professor in the Department of Physics at the University of Texas at Austin.

== Early life and education ==
Breizman began his academic training at the Moscow Institute of Physics and Technology, where he graduated with honors as an Engineer-Physicist in 1968. He subsequently pursued graduate studies at the Budker Institute of Nuclear Physics in Novosibirsk, Russia, earning his Candidate of Science in Physics and Mathematics in 1971. In 1980, he was awarded a Doctor of Science degree in Physics and Mathematics from the same institution under the supervision of Dmitri Ryutov.

== Career ==
From 1971 to 1992, he held a sequence of increasingly senior roles at the Budker Institute of Nuclear Physics, culminating in the position of Leading Scientist (1986–1992). Concurrently, he was an educator at Novosibirsk State University, serving as an Assistant Professor (1968–1974), Associate Professor (1974–1981), and eventually a full Professor (1981–1992).

In 1992, Breizman relocated to the United States to join the Institute for Fusion Studies at the University of Texas at Austin as a Senior Research Fellow. Over the following decades, he advanced to Research Scientist (1993–2003) and Senior Research Scientist (2003–2011). Since 2011, he has held the title of Research Professor within the UT Austin Department of Physics.

== Research ==
Breizman has worked on the collective phenomena of plasmas, particularly Alfvén waves. In the mid-1990s, alongside physicist Herbert L. Berk, Breizman developed the Berk-Breizman model.

Additionally, Breizman contributed to the theoretical underpinning of the Variable Specific Impulse Magnetoplasma Rocket (VASIMR) project in collaboration with NASA. He has investigated the physics of laser-irradiated clusters and the propagation of helicon waves in non-uniform plasmas. He has published research on the physics and mitigation of runaway electrons in tokamaks.

== Awards ==
- 1998: Awarded the Ernst Mach Honorary Medal for Merit in the Physical Sciences by the Czech Academy of Sciences.
- 2001: Elected as a Fellow of the American Physical Society (APS).

== Selected publications ==
- H. L. Berk, B. N. Breizman, N. V. Petviashvili (1998)."Spontaneous hole-clump pair creation in weakly unstable plasmas". Physics Letters A, 234(3).
- S. E. Sharapov, & B. N. Breizman, (2025). "Confinement and Stability of Fast Ions in Fusion Plasmas". CRC Press.
- B. N. Breizman and S. E. Sharapov (1995). "Energetic particle drive for toroidicity-induced Alfven eigenmodes and kinetic toroidicity-induced Alfven eigenmodes in a low-shear tokamak". Plasma Physics and Controlled Fusion, 37.
- B. N. Breizman, P. Aleynikov, E. M. Hollmann, & M. Lehnen. (2019). "Physics of runaway electrons in tokamaks." Nuclear Fusion, 59(8).
- J. B. Rosenzweig, B. N. Breizman, T. Katsouleas, & J. J. Su. (1991). "Acceleration and focusing of electrons in two-dimensional nonlinear plasma wake fields." Physical Review A, 44(10).
- B. N. Breizman and D. D. Ryutov (1974). "Powerful relativistic electron beams in a plasma and in a vacuum (theory)". Nuclear Fusion, 14(6)
