= Oblplan House =

Tourist attraction in Novosibirsk, Russia

- Дом Облплана
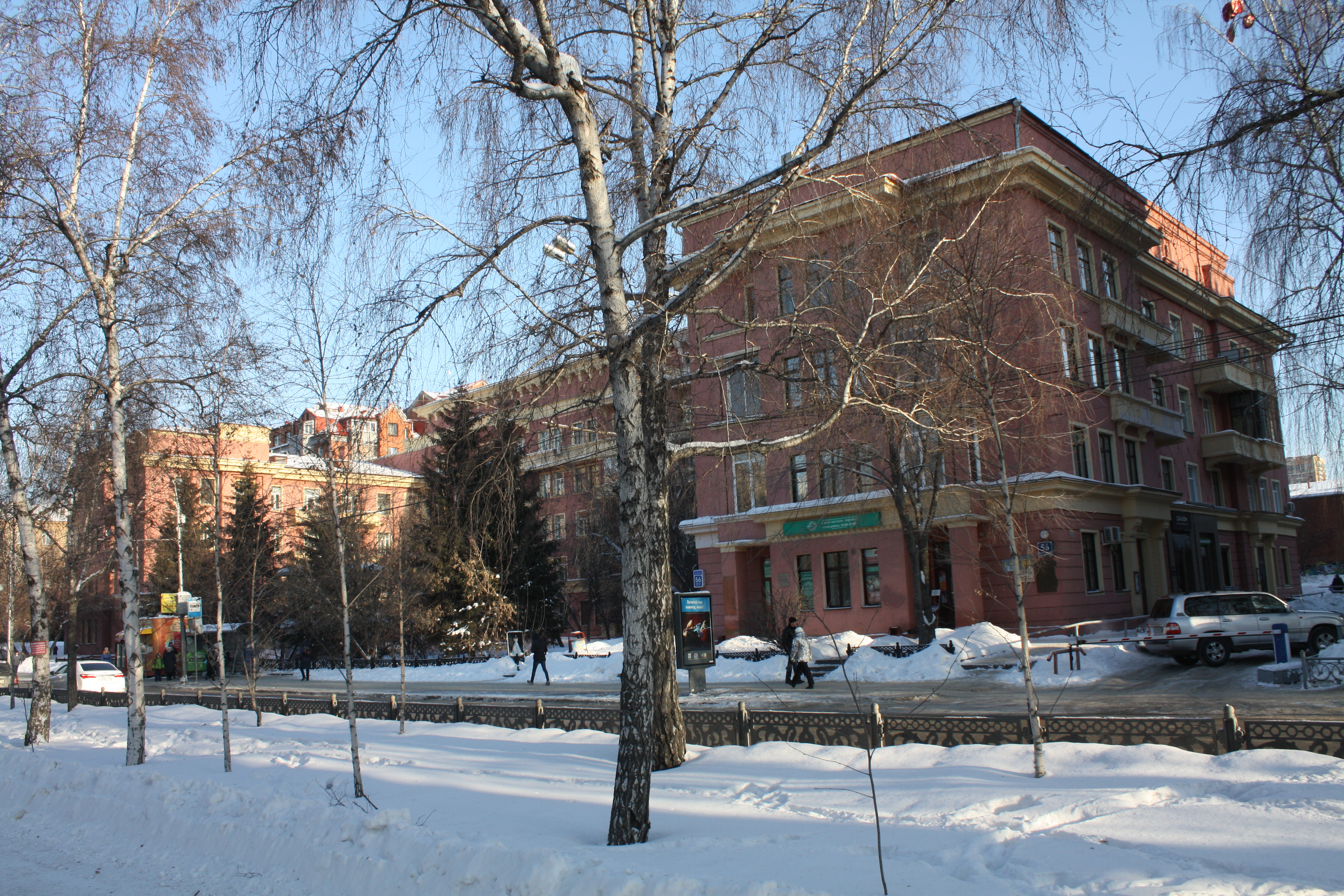
- Interactive map of the Oblplan House area

General information
- Location: Krasny Avenue 56, Novosibirsk, Russia
- Coordinates: 55.03761°N 82.91948°E
- Completed: 1939

Design and construction
- Architect: N. S. Kuzmin

Oblplan House (Russian: Дом Облплана) is a residential building in neoclassical style. It is located in Tsentralny City District of Novosibirsk, Russia, on Krasny Avenue. The building was built in 1939. Architect: N. S. Kuzmin.

== Location ==
The building is located on Krasny Avenue opposite Kuzbassugol Building Complex.

== Gallery ==
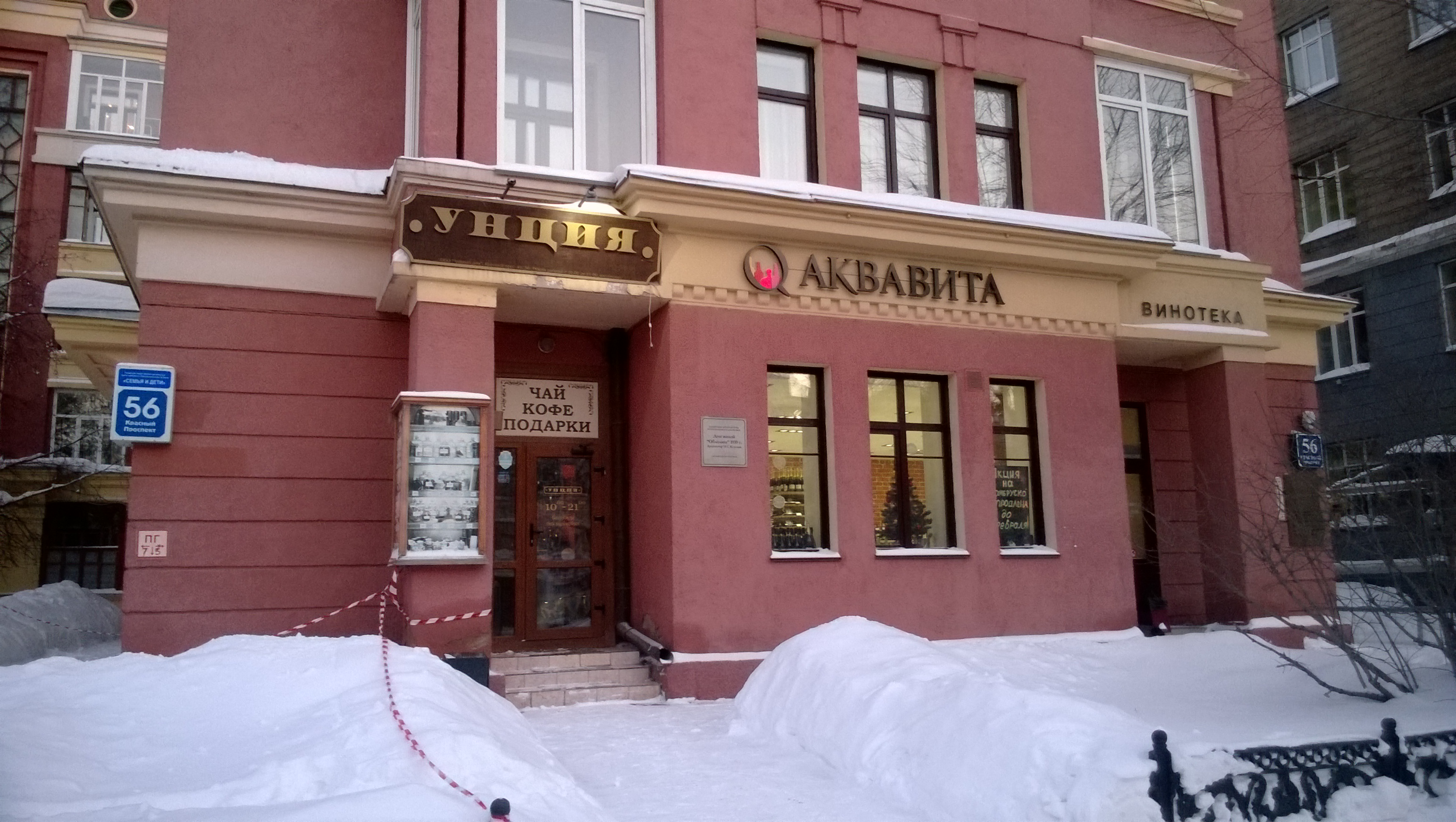

== Notable residents ==
- Alexander Logvinenko (1903–2000) is a Soviet scientist in the field of chemistry and technology of mineral processing. He lived in the house from 1951 to 2000.
- Andrey Novikov (1909–1979) is a Soviet composer and conductor. He lived in the building from 1972 to 1979.

== See also ==
- Oblpotrebsoyuz Building
- House of Socialist Agriculture
