= PPU (union) =

British pilot union

The PPU
- The PPU
- Founded: 26 November 2012
- Dissolved: 2 February 2021
- Headquarters: Macclesfield, England
- Location: United Kingdom
- Members: 325
- Key people: Glen Beresford, Board Chair; Roy Wheatley, Board Vice-Chair; Stephen Walker, Board Secretary; Dave Williams, Board member; David Mutty, Board member
- Website: www.theppu.co.uk

The PPU was a British pilots' union that represented a minority of the pilots who worked for Virgin Atlantic.

== History ==
On 26 November 2012, the PPU was certified as a new union by the Trades Union Certification Officer. "The PPU was launched after a poll of 548 Virgin Atlantic pilots in June 2012 returned a 76% response and an 87.4% vote in favour" of setting up a new union to represent its members' needs.

The PPU's AR21 form for the year ending 31 December 2018 declared that it had 325 members. It represented 30% of Virgin Atlantic's pilots. The AR21 showed a deficit of £150,840 for the year and an amount remaining in their general fund of £175,492.

The PPU was a web-based "e-union" that used technology to give it and its members a global 24/7/365 presence. Membership was eventually expanded to include pilots working for TUI Airways and British Airways.

The union was dissolved in February 2021.

== See also ==
- British Airline Pilots' Association
- Independent Pilots Association (United Kingdom)
