= Murafa =

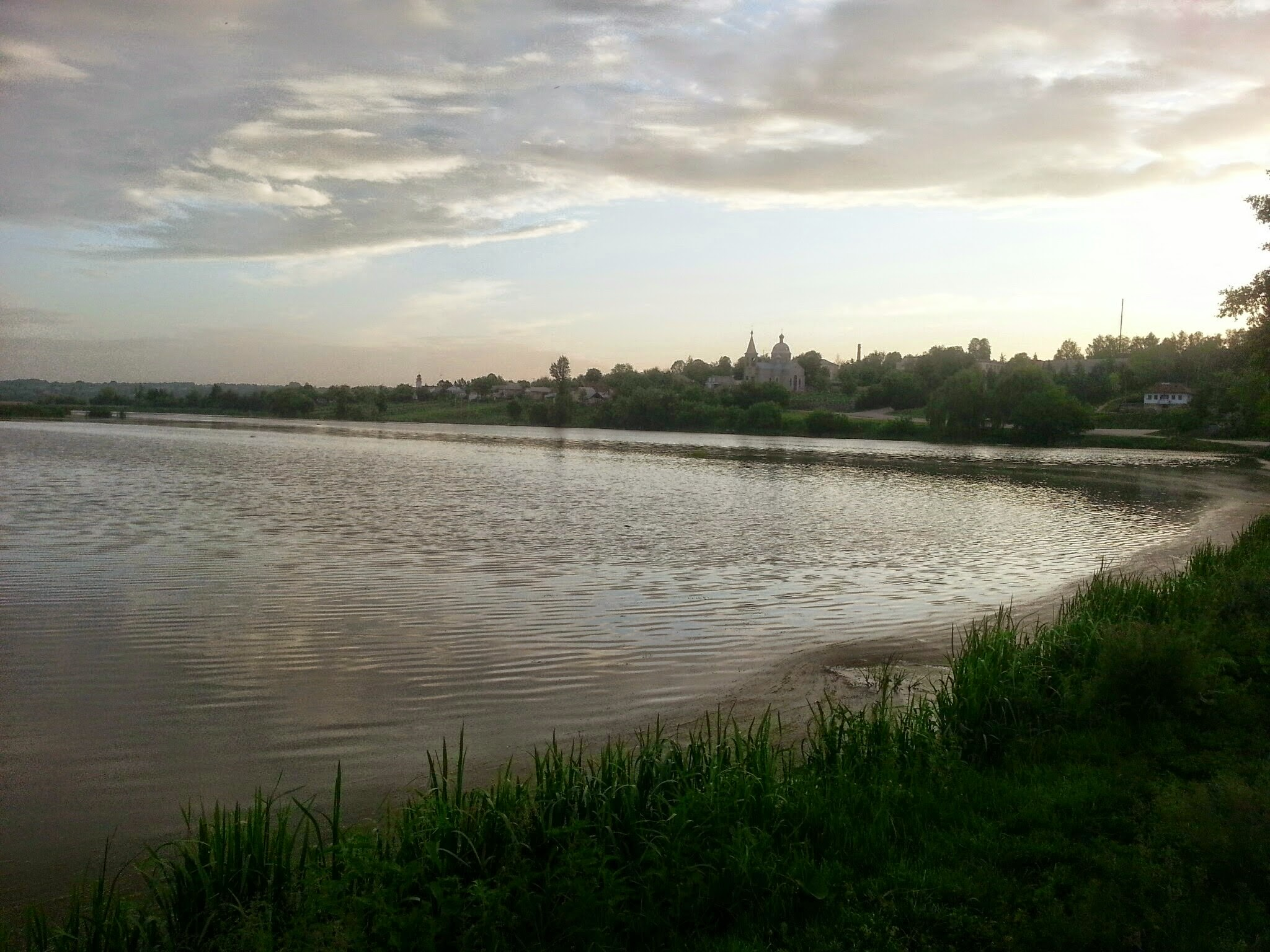

Location
- Country: Ukraine

Physical characteristics
- Source
  - location: Vinnytsia Oblast
- Mouth: Dniester
  - coordinates: 48°12′40″N 28°13′49″E
- Length: 163 km (101 mi)
- Basin size: 2,410 km^{2} (930 sq mi)

Basin features
- Progression: Dniester→ Dniester Estuary→ Black Sea

The Murafa (Ukrainian: Мурафа) is a river in Ukraine, a left tributary of the Dniester. It is 163 kilometres (101 mi) long and its basin area is 2,410 square kilometres (931 sq mi). The Murafa river finds its source near the village of Zatoky in Bar Raion, Vinnytsia Oblast. It flows into the Dniester near Yampil.
