= Power processing unit =

Component responsible for regulating electrical power

A power processing unit (PPU) is a circuit device that convert an electricity input from a utility line into the appropriate voltage and current to be used for the device in question. They serve the same purpose as linear amplifiers, but they are much more efficient, since the use of linear amplifiers results in much power loss due to the use of a resistor to change the voltage and current. Instead of using a resistor, PPUs use switches to turn a signal on and off quite rapidly in order to change the average current and voltage. In this way, they could be conflated with DC-AC converters, but the frequency at which they switch the signal on and off is a few orders of magnitude higher than that of AC signals. They are used to convert the current and voltage of both direct current (DC) and alternating current (AC) signals.

== Spacecraft ==
In the context of spacecraft, the power processing unit (PPU) is a module containing the electrical subsystem responsible for providing electrical power to other parts of the spacecraft. The PPU needs to be able to cope with varying demands for power output and provide that power in the most efficient manner possible.

There are two main constraints placed on PPUs:

- Power generation from, for instance, a solar array or radioisotope thermoelectric generator where power generation can vary based on external conditions.
- Power utilization, which varies depending on the current internal activities performed by the spacecraft such as burst radio transmission or external demand factors like outside temperature and the need to provide heat to maintain constant internal temperature.

Major considerations in building PPUs are weight, size and efficiency.

Most PPUs process and supply direct current because that is what is generated by a solar array.

The PPU is also responsible for voltage conversion and supplying the required voltage to other subsystems of the spacecraft.
