= Index of aerospace engineering articles =

This is an alphabetical list of articles pertaining specifically to aerospace engineering. For a broad overview of engineering, see List of engineering topics. For biographies, see List of engineers.

== A ==
- Ablative laser propulsion —
- Absolute value —
- Acceleration —
- Action —
- Advanced Space Vision System —
- Aeroacoustics —
- Aerobrake —
- Aerobraking —
- Aerocapture —
- Aerodynamics —
- Aeroelasticity —
- Aeronautical abbreviations —
- Aeronautics —
- Aerospace engineering —
- Aerospike engine —
- Aerostat —
- Aft-crossing trajectory —
- Aileron —
- Air-augmented rocket —
- Aircraft —
- Aircraft flight control systems —
- Aircraft flight mechanics —
- Airfoil —
- Airlock —
- Airship —
- Alcubierre drive —
- Angle of attack —
- Angular momentum —
- Angular velocity —
- Antimatter rocket —
- Apsis —
- Arcjet rocket —
- Areal velocity —
- ARP4761 —
- Aspect ratio (wing) —
- Astrodynamics —
- Atmospheric reentry —
- Attitude control —
- Avionics —

== B ==
- Balloon —
- Ballute —
- Beam-powered propulsion —
- Bernoulli's equation —
- Bi-elliptic transfer —
- Big dumb booster —
- Bipropellant rocket —
- Bleed air —
- Booster rocket —
- Breakthrough Propulsion Physics Program —
- Buoyancy —
- Bussard ramjet —

== C ==
- Canard —
- Centennial challenges —
- Center of gravity —
- Center of mass —
- Center of pressure —
- Chord —
- Collimated light —
- Compressibility —
- Computational fluid dynamics —
- Computing —
- Control engineering —
- Conservation of momentum —
- Crew Exploration Vehicle —
- Critical mach —
- Centrifugal compressor —
- Chevron nozzle —

== D ==
- De Laval nozzle —
- Deflection —
- Delta-v —
- Delta-v budget —
- Density —
- Derivative —
- Digital Datcom —
- Displacement (vector) —
- DO-178B —
- DO-254 —
- Drag (physics) —
- Drag coefficient —
- Drag equation —
- Dual mode propulsion rocket —
- Delta wing —

== E ==
- Earth's atmosphere —
- Electrostatic ion thruster —
- Elliptic partial differential equation —
- Energy —
- Engineering —
- Engineering economics —
- Enstrophy —
- Equation of motion —
- Euler angles —
- European Space Agency —
- Expander cycle (rocket) —

== F ==
- Field Emission Electric Propulsion —
- Fixed-wing aircraft —
- Flight control surfaces —
- Flight control system (aircraft) —
- Flight control system (helicopter) —
- Flight dynamics —
- Floatstick —
- Fluid —
- Fluid dynamics —
- Fluid mechanics —
- Fluid statics —
- Force —
- Freefall —
- Fuselage —
- Future Air Navigation System —
- Flying wing —

== G ==
- Gas-generator cycle (rocket) —
- Geostationary orbit —
- Geosynchronous orbit —
- Glide ratio —
- GPS —
- Gravitational constant —
- Gravitational slingshot —
- Gravity —
- Gravity turn —
- Guidance, navigation and control —
- Guidance system —

== H ==
- Hall-effect thruster —
- Heat shield —
- Helicopter —
- Hohmann transfer orbit —
- Hybrid rocket —
- Hydrodynamics —
- Hydrostatics —
- Hyperbolic partial differential equation —
- Hypersonic —
- HyShot —

== I ==
- Impulse —
- Inertial navigation system —
- Instrument landing system —
- Integral —
- Internal combustion —
- Interplanetary Transport Network —
- Interplanetary travel —
- Interstellar travel —
- Ion thruster —
- ISRO

== J ==
- Jet engine —

== K ==
- Kepler's laws of planetary motion —
- Kessler syndrome —
- Kestrel rocket engine —
- Kinetic energy —
- Kite —
- Kutta condition —
- Kutta–Joukowski theorem —

== L ==
- Landing —
- Landing gear —
- Lagrangian —
- Lagrangian point —
- Laser broom —
- Laser Camera System —
- Latus rectum —
- Launch window —
- Law of universal gravitation —
- Leading edge —
- Lift —
- Lift coefficient —
- Lightcraft —
- Lighter than air —
- Liquid air cycle engine —
- Liquid fuels —
- Liquid rocket propellants —
- Lithobraking —
- Loiter —
- Low Earth orbit —
- Lunar space elevator —

== M ==
- Mach number —
- Magnetic sail —
- Magnetoplasmadynamic thruster —
- Mass —
- Mass driver —
- Mechanics of fluids —
- Membrane mirror —
- Metre per second —
- Microwave landing system —
- Mini-magnetospheric plasma propulsion —
- Missile guidance —
- Moment of inertia —
- Momentum —
- Momentum wheel —
- Monopropellant rocket —
- Motion —
- Multistage rocket —

== N ==
- Nanotechnology —
- NASA —
- Navier–Stokes equations —
- Newton (unit) —
- Newton's laws of motion —
- Nose cone design —
- Nozzle —

== O ==
- Orbit —
- Orbit phasing —
- Orbiter Boom Sensor System —
- Orbital elements —
- Orbital inclination change —
- Orbital maneuver —
- Orbital node —
- Orbital period —
- Orbital stationkeeping —
- Osculating orbit —

== P ==
- Parallel axes rule —
- Parasitic drag —
- Parawing —
- Perpendicular axes rule —
- Physics —
- Planetary orbit —
- Plasma (physics) —
- Plug nozzle —
- Pogo oscillation —
- Prandtl-Glauert singularity —
- Precession —
- Pressure —
- Pressure altitude —
- Pressure-fed engine —
- Propeller —
- Proper orbital elements —
- Pulsed inductive thruster —
- Pulsed plasma thruster —
- Propulsion —
- Philippine Space Agency —

== R ==
- Radar —
- Railgun —
- Ram accelerator —
- Ramjet —
- Reaction control system —
- Reentry —
- Reflection —
- Relativistic rocket —
- Remote Manipulator System —
- Resistojet rocket —
- Reusable launch system —
- Reynolds number —
- RL10 (rocket engine) —
- Rocket —
- Rocket engine nozzle —
- Rocket fuel —
- Rocket launch —
- Rudder —

== S ==
- SABRE —
- Satellite —
- Saturn (rocket family) —
- Scalar (physics) —
- Schlieren —
- Schlieren photography —
- Scramjet —
- Second moment of area —
- Shock wave —
- SI —
- Single-stage to orbit —
- Skyhook (structure) —
- Stream function —
- Streamline —
- Solar panel —
- Solar sail —
- Solar thermal rocket —
- Solid of revolution —
- Solid rocket —
- Sound barrier —
- Space activity suit —
- Space elevator —
- Space fountain —
- Space plane —
- Space Shuttle —
- Space Shuttle external tank —
- Space Shuttle Main Engine —
- Space station —
- Space suit —
- Space technology —
- Space transport —
- Spacecraft —
- Spacecraft design —
- Spacecraft propulsion —
- Special relativity —
- Specific impulse —
- Speed of sound —
- Staged combustion cycle (rocket) —
- Subsonic —
- Supersonic —
- Surface of revolution —
- Sweep theory —

== T ==
- Tait–Bryan rotations —
- Temperature —
- Terminal velocity —
- Test target —
- Tether propulsion —
- Thermal protection system —
- Thermodynamics —
- Thrust —
- Thrust vector control —
- Thruster —
- Torricelli's equation —
- Trajectory —
- Trailing edge —
- Trans Lunar Injection —
- Transonic —
- Transverse wave —
- Tripropellant rocket —
- Tsiolkovsky rocket equation —
- Turbomachinery —
- Two-stage-to-orbit —

== U ==
- UFO
- UAV

== V ==
- V-2 rocket —
- Variable specific impulse magnetoplasma rocket —
- Velocity —
- Viscometer —
- Viscosity —
- Vortex generator —

== W ==
- Wave drag —
- Weight —
- Weight function —
- Wind tunnel —
- Wing —
- Wright Flyer —
- Wright Glider of 1902 —

== See also ==
- List of aerospace engineering software
