= Spacecraft Fabrication Facility (Goddard) =

The Spacecraft Fabrication Facility is a unit at the Goddard Space Flight Center where technicians and engineers manufacture components used for spacecraft assembly. This includes the tools which the astronauts use in space as well as the spacecraft themselves.

== Branches ==
The Mission Engineering and Systems Analysis Branch is broken up into seven smaller branches:

- GN&C Systems Engineering Branch
- Systems Engineering Services and Advanced Concepts Branch
- Flight Dynamics Analysis Branch
- Component Hardware Systems Branch
- Propulsion Branch - The Propulsion branch is responsible for the spacecraft propulsion subsystems design, fabrication, analysis, integration, testing, propellant loading, and launch. The branch has supported major spaceflight operations, including the Lunar Reconnaissance Orbiter (LRO).
- GN&C Mission Systems Engineering Branch
- Mission Systems Engineering Branch
