= Theoretical spacecraft propulsion =

Hypothetical propulsion systems for interstellar travel

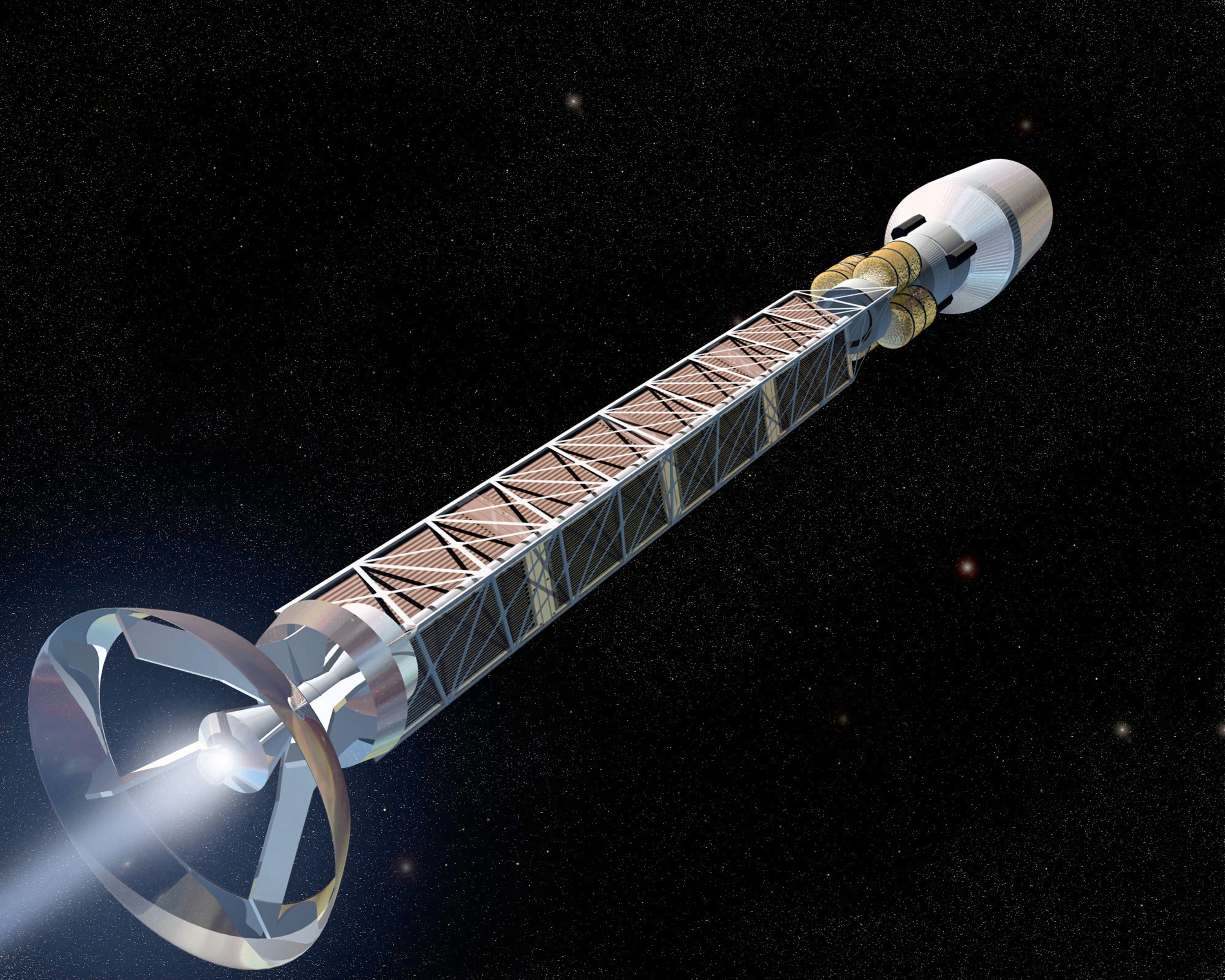
A proposed antimatter rocket

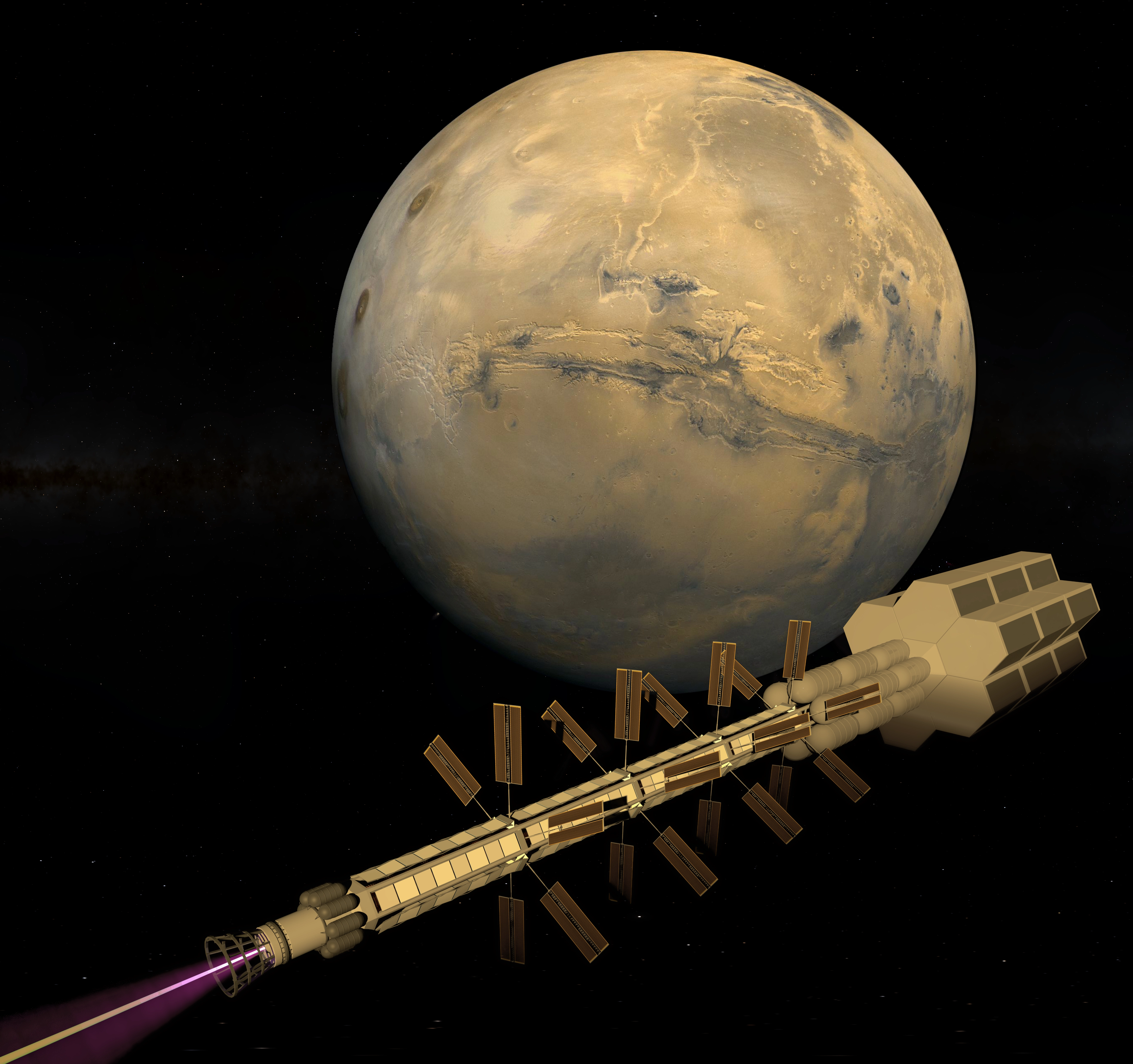
3D sketch of an electromagnetic propulsion fusion plasma thruster

Theoretical spacecraft propulsion refers to a series of theoretical spacecraft propulsion systems mainly proposed for interstellar travel.

== Fission sail ==
The fission sail is a type of spacecraft propulsion proposed by Robert Forward that uses fission fragments to propel a large solar sail-like craft. It is similar in concept to the fission-fragment rocket in that the fission by-products are directly harnessed as working mass, and differs primarily in the way that the fragments are used for thrust.

In the fission sail, the "rocket" is built in the form of a two-layer sheet, with some sort of absorber on one side, and nuclear fuel on the other. Atoms in the fuel that decay will release their fragments in random, but opposite, directions. In the simple case where the decay releases the fragments "front" and "rear", the rearward moving fragment generates thrust directly, while the frontward moving one is absorbed in the front half of the sail with no net contribution to thrust. The sail is not a nuclear reactor, and relies on natural decay rates for energy release. The thrust from such a system will always be very low, albeit extremely efficient.

Forward proposed the system as an "add on" to existing solar sails. Close to stars where the light density is high the sails work fine, but as they move past about 2 AU their thrust is too low to be useful. Forward suggested that coating the sail with fissionable material would provide thrust in this region, where maneuvering is no longer as important. Such a system would accelerate and maneuver based on solar energy for the start of its flight, and then continue to accelerate at a lower rate for long periods of time.

== Gravitational shielding ==
The term gravitational shielding refers to a hypothetical process of shielding an object from the influence of a gravitational field. Such processes, if they existed, would have the effect of reducing the weight of an object. The shape of the shielded region would be similar to a shadow from the gravitational shield. For example, the shape of the shielded region above a disk would be conical. The height of the cone's apex above the disk would vary directly with the height of the shielding disk above the earth. Experimental evidence to date indicates that no such effect exists. Gravitational shielding is considered to be a violation of the equivalence principle and therefore inconsistent with both Newtonian theory and general relativity.

The concept of gravity shielding is a common concept in science fiction literature, especially for space travel. One of the first and best known examples is the fictional gravity shielding substance "Cavorite" that appears in H. G. Wells's classic 1901 novel The First Men in the Moon. Wells was promptly criticized for using it by Jules Verne.

== Nano electrokinetic thruster ==
The Nano electrokinetic thruster is a theoretical space propulsion system based on the principle of electro-osmosis (also electroosmotic flow). It allows for a high specific impulse and high thrust-to-power ratio as well as a high final velocity which makes it suitable for a wide variety of applications. Due to difficulties in the production of the needed carbon nanotubes experimental testing has not yet started.

The principle of electro-osmosis or electroosmotic flow creates a flow of an electrolyte through a very small tube in the nano-meter range. To achieve this flow there is a cathode and an anode at the ends of the tube over which a voltage is applied. Due to this voltage the ions in the electrolyte stored in a reservoir directly connected to the tube can be accelerated and ejected. This way electrical energy is transformed into kinetic energy. The amount of thrust created by one nano thruster is in the micro newton range, however due to its size it makes sense to arrange a large number in an array to achieve sufficient thrust. The thrust, exit velocity of the ions and the mass flow rate of the electrolyte are influenced by the applied voltage which makes it easy to regulate those parameters. The applied voltage and the pH-value of the electrolyte (amount of ions it contains) also vary the balance between thrust, efficiency and maximal exhaust velocity (determines the maximal achievable flight velocity). It is also theoretically possible to achieve a very high efficiency of nearly 100% as well as a high specific impulse and high thrust-to-power ratio. This system has not yet been built and experimentally tested because of difficulties with the production of the nano-tubes needed for it.

== See also ==
- Spacecraft propulsion
- Magnetoplasmadynamic thruster
- Pulsed plasma thruster
- Variable Specific Impulse Magnetoplasma Rocket
- Electromagnetic propulsion
- Spacecraft electric propulsion
