= ENU (disambiguation) =

ENU (N-ethyl-N-nitrosourea) is a mutagen.

Enu or ENU may also refer to:

- Akanu Ibiam International Airport, serving Enugu, Nigeria
- East north up, a geographical system of Local tangent plane coordinates
- Enu language, a language of China
- L. N. Gumilyov Eurasian National University, in Kazakhstan
- Enu Island, one of the Bissagos Islands
- Enu Island, an island of Indonesia
- ENU, a three-letter code representing the English language introduced by Microsoft for Software distribution
