= State vector =

State vector may refer to:

- A quantum state vector
- The state of a system described by a state space representation
  - A state vector (geographical) specifies the position and velocity of an object in any location on Earth's surface
  - Orbital state vectors are vectors of position and velocity that together with their time, uniquely determine the state of an orbiting body in astrodynamics or in celestial dynamics
