= Topocentric =

Topocentric may refer to:

- a local tangent plane coordinate system, used for e.g. navigational purposes
- a proposed astrological ordering system from 1964
