= Fission sail =

Hypothetical method of spacecraft propulsion

The fission sail is a type of spacecraft propulsion proposed by Robert Forward that uses fission fragments to propel a large solar sail-like craft. It is similar in concept to the fission-fragment rocket in that the fission by-products are directly harnessed as working mass, and differs primarily in the way that the fragments are used for thrust.

In the fission sail, the "rocket" is built in the form of a two-layer sheet, with some sort of absorber on one side, and nuclear fuel on the other. Atoms in the fuel that decay will release their fragments in random, but opposite, directions. In the simple case where the decay releases the fragments "front" and "rear", the rearward moving fragment generates thrust directly, while the frontward moving one is absorbed in the front half of the sail with no net contribution to thrust. The sail is not a nuclear reactor, and relies on natural decay rates for energy release. The thrust from such a system will always be very low, albeit extremely efficient.

Forward proposed the system as an "add on" to existing solar sails. Close to stars where the light density is high the sails work fine, but as they move past about 2 AU their thrust is too low to be useful. Forward suggested that coating the sail with fissionable material would provide thrust in this region, where maneuvering is no longer as important. Such a system would accelerate and maneuver based on solar energy for the start of its flight, and then continue to accelerate at a lower rate for long periods of time.
