= Applied physics =

Connection between physics and engineering

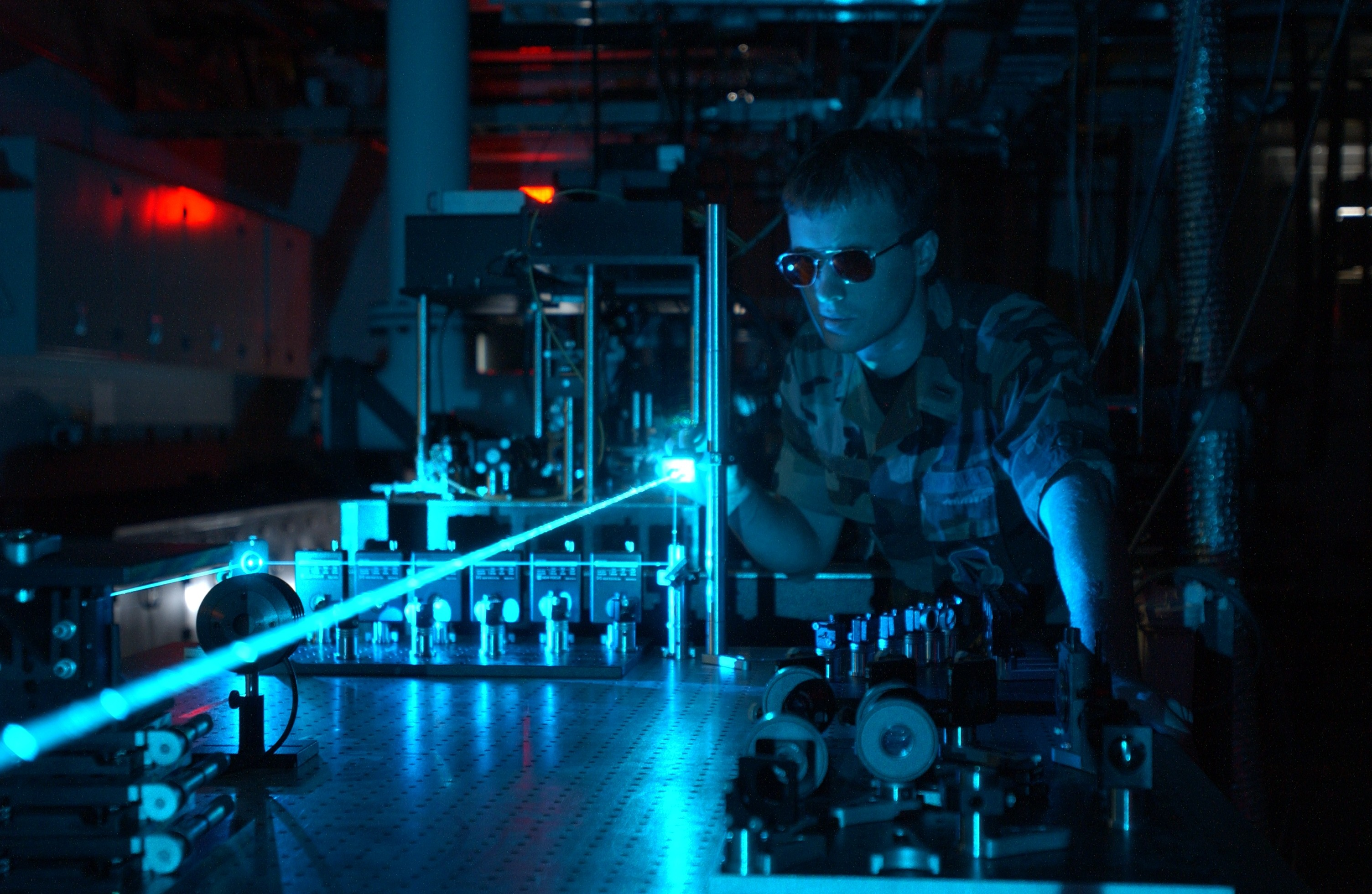
Experiment using a laser

A magnetic resonance image

Applied physics is the application of physics to solve scientific or engineering problems. It is usually considered a bridge or a connection between physics and engineering. "Applied" is distinguished from "pure" by a subtle combination of factors, such as the motivation and attitude of researchers and the nature of the relationship to the technology or science that may be affected by the work. Applied physics is rooted in the fundamental truths and basic concepts of the physical sciences but is concerned with the utilization of scientific principles in practical devices and systems and with the application of physics in other areas of science and high technology.

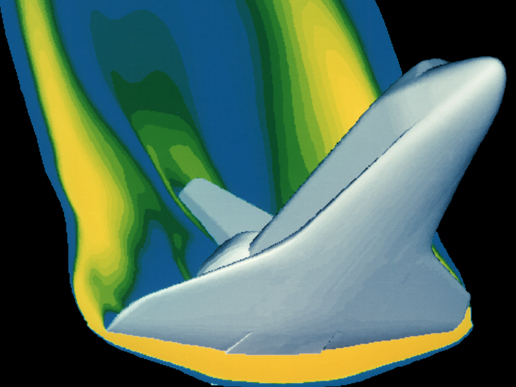
Computer modeling of the Space Shuttle during re-entry

== Examples of research and development areas ==
- Accelerator physics
- Acoustics
- Atmospheric physics
- Atomic, molecular, and optical physics
- Biophysics
- Brain–computer interfacing
- Chemical physics
- Condensed matter physics
- Differentiable programming
  - Artificial intelligence
  - Scientific computing
- Engineering physics
  - Chemical engineering
  - Electrical engineering
    - Electronics engineering
      - Computer science & engineering
        - Artificial intelligence
          - Machine learning
          - Deep learning
          - Reinforcement learning
    - Power engineering
      - Power electronics
    - Control engineering
  - Materials science and engineering and Solid-state physics
    - Metamaterials
    - Nanotechnology
    - Semiconductors
    - Thin films
  - Mechanical engineering
    - Aerospace engineering
      - Astrodynamics
      - Electromagnetic propulsion
      - Fluid mechanics
  - Military engineering
    - Lidar
    - Radar
    - Sonar
    - Stealth technology
  - Nuclear engineering
    - Fission reactors
    - Fusion reactors
  - Optical engineering
    - Photonics
      - Cavity optomechanics
      - Lasers
      - Photonic crystals
- Geophysics
- Materials physics
- Medical physics
  - Health physics
    - Radiation dosimetry
  - Medical imaging
    - Magnetic resonance imaging
  - Radiation therapy
- Microscopy
  - Scanning probe microscopy
    - Atomic force microscopy
    - Scanning tunneling microscopy
  - Scanning electron microscopy
  - Transmission electron microscopy
- Nuclear physics
  - Fission
  - Fusion
- Optical physics
  - Nonlinear optics
  - Quantum optics
- Plasma physics
- Quantum technology
  - Quantum computing
  - Quantum cryptography
- Renewable energy
- Space physics
- Spectroscopy

== See also ==
- Applied science
- Applied mathematics
- Engineering
- Engineering physics
- High technology
