= Spacecraft propulsion =

Method used to accelerate spacecraft

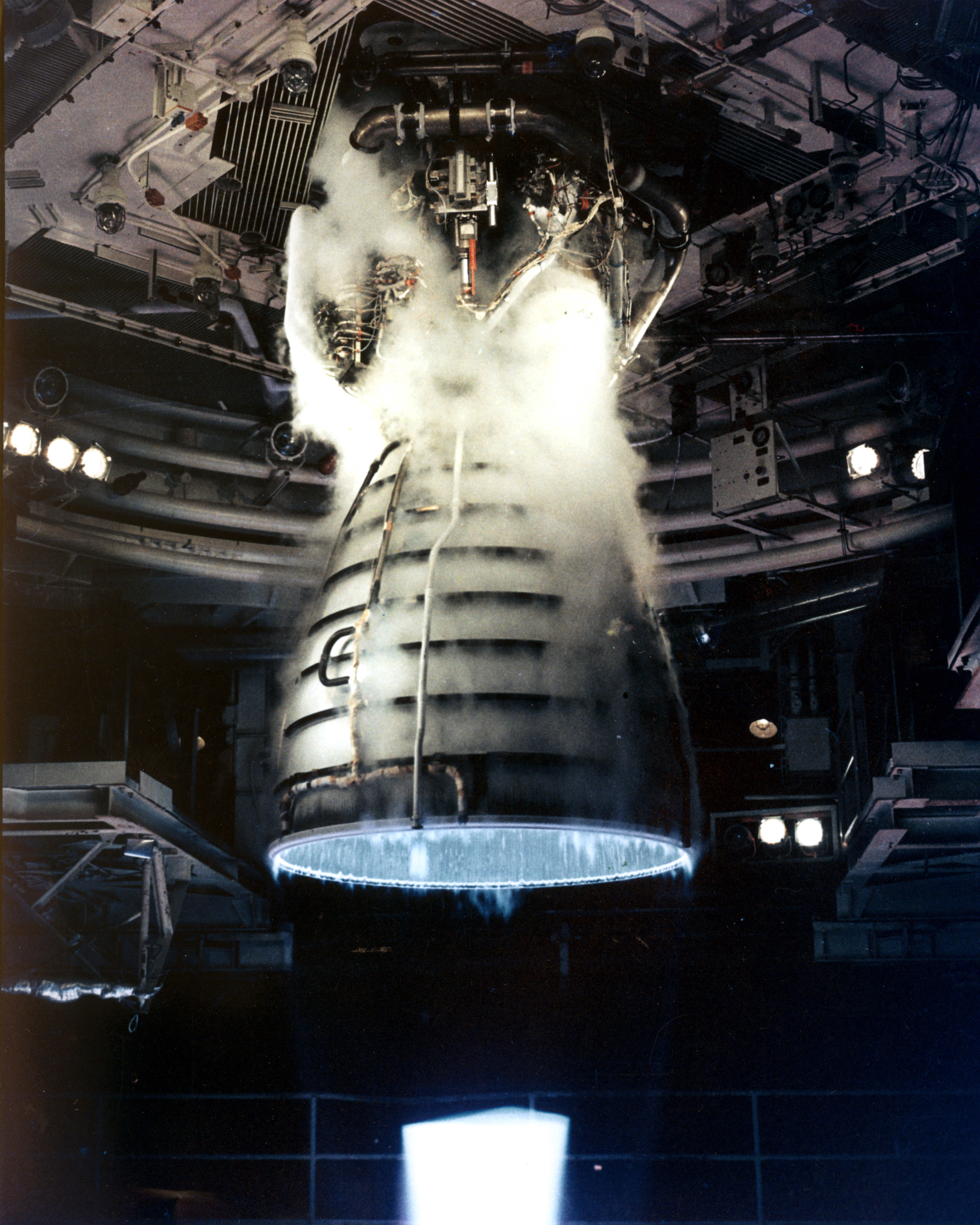
A remote camera captures a close-up view of an RS-25 during a test firing at the John C. Stennis Space Center in Hancock County, Mississippi.

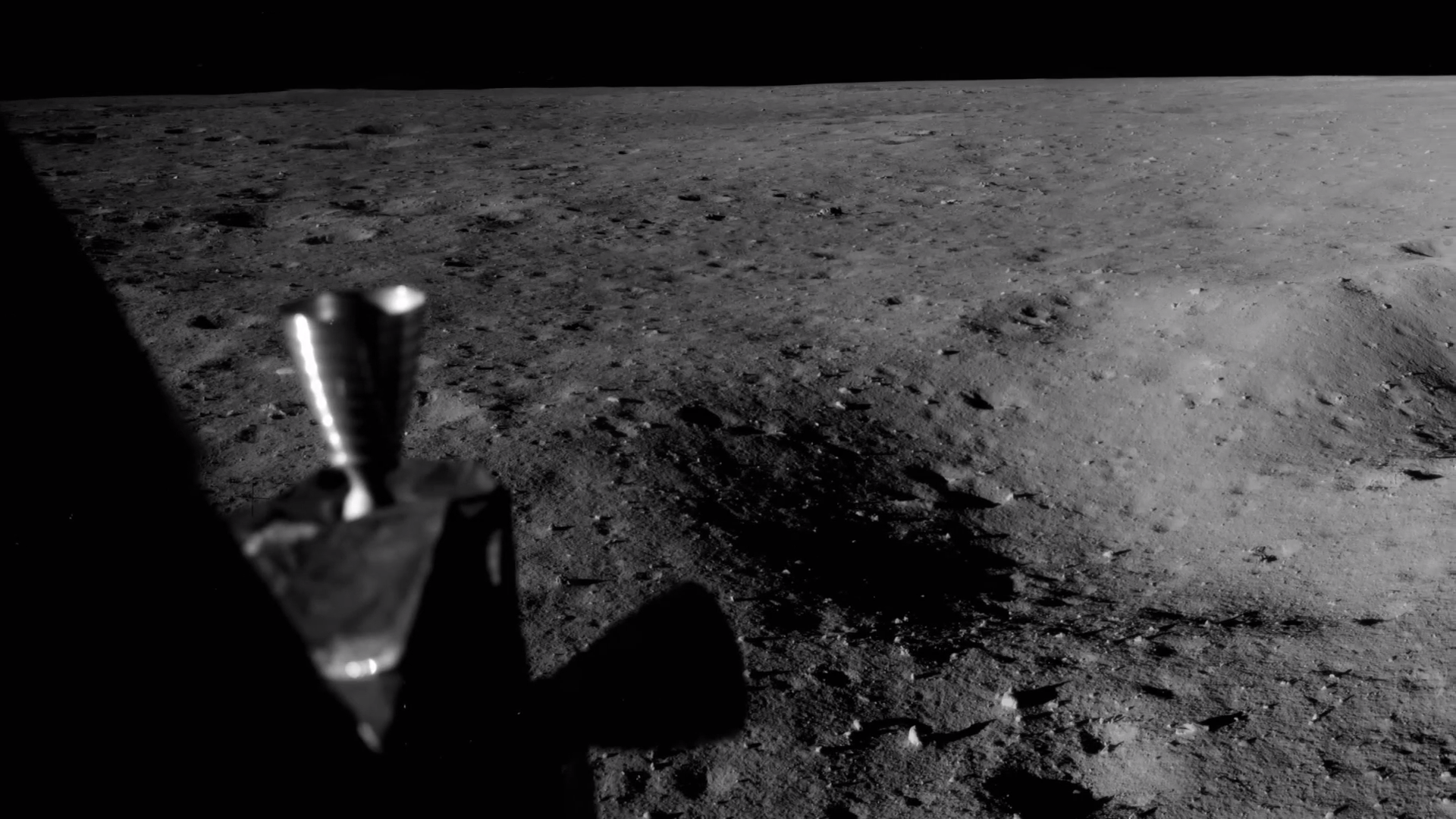
Bipropellant rocket engines of the Apollo Lunar Module reaction control system (RCS)

Spacecraft propulsion is any method used to change the velocity of spacecraft or artificial satellites. In-space propulsion is used to maneuver the spacecraft after the launch vehicle has lifted it into outer space.

Several methods of pragmatic spacecraft propulsion have been developed, each having its own advantages and drawbacks. Most satellites use simple reliable chemical thrusters such as monopropellant rockets or resistojet rockets to maintain orbital station-keeping, while a few use momentum wheels for attitude control. Russian and antecedent Soviet bloc satellites have used electric propulsion for decades, and newer Western geo-orbiting spacecraft are starting to use them for north–south station-keeping and orbit raising. Most interplanetary spacecraft use chemical rocket propulsion as well; a few have used electric propulsion methods such as ion thrusters and Hall-effect thrusters.

Various propulsion technologies are actively being developed to pioneer space missions of wide vairety, especially to create faster and more efficient propulsion technologies. Hypothetical propulsion technologies are intended to provide effective exploration of the Solar System and permit humanity to reach farther distances more with greater reliability, safety, and efficiency. Some examples of future propulsion technology are nuclear propulsion and solar sails.

== Purpose and function ==
A spacecraft propulsion system provides propulsive force for orbital transfer, interplanetary trajectories, and potentially for landing and ascent. In addition, propulsion is needed for orienting and positioning the spacecraft in route as well as orbit maintenance (reaction control, station keeping, precision pointing, and orbital maneuvering).

While a spacecraft is in orbit, any additional impulse, even tiny, will result in a change in the orbit path, in three ways, corresponding to the three dimensions of space:

- Prograde/retrograde (i.e. acceleration in the tangential/opposite in tangential direction), which increases/decreases altitude of orbit.
- Perpendicular to orbital plane, which changes orbital inclination.
- Radially, i.e. towards or away from the body being orbited, which alters the eccentricity of the orbit.

Earth's surface is situated fairly deep in a gravity well; the escape velocity required to leave its orbit is 11.2 kilometers per second. Thus for destinations beyond, propulsion systems need enough propellant and to be of high enough efficiency. The same is true for other planets and moons, albeit some have lower gravity wells.

As human beings evolved in a gravitational field of "one g" (9.81 m/s^{2}), it would be safer for acceleration rates of the spacecraft to be about or not too far from 1G, as human bodies can only tolerate up to 9Gs, which is approximately 88.29 m/s^{2}. The occupants of a rocket or spaceship with the propulsion system constantly accelerating at 1G would experience artificial gravity, however this is not a practical method as it requires constant acceleration (which requires large amounts fuel to be effective).

== Theory ==
Nearly all types of modern spacecraft propulsion are reaction engines, which produce thrust by expelling reaction mass, in accordance with Newton's third law of motion. The Tsiolkovsky rocket equation shows, using the law of conservation of momentum, that for a rocket engine propulsion method to change the momentum of a spacecraft, it must change the momentum of something else in the opposite direction. In other words, the rocket must exhaust mass opposite the spacecraft's acceleration direction, with such exhausted mass called propellant or reaction mass. For this to happen, both reaction mass and energy are needed. The impulse provided by launching a particle of reaction mass with mass m at velocity v is mv. But (following Newton's second law of motion) this particle has kinetic energy 1/2mv^{2}, which must come from somewhere. In a conventional solid, liquid, or hybrid rocket, fuel is burned, providing the energy, and the reaction products are allowed to flow out of the engine nozzle, providing the reaction mass. In an ion thruster, electricity is used to accelerate ions behind the spacecraft. Here other sources must provide the electrical energy (e.g. a solar panel or a nuclear reactor), whereas the ions provide the reaction mass.

The rate of change of velocity is called acceleration and the rate of change of momentum is called force. To reach a given velocity, one can apply a small acceleration over a long period of time, or a large acceleration over a short time; similarly, one can achieve a given impulse with a large force over a short time or a small force over a long time. This means that for maneuvering in space, a propulsion method that produces tiny accelerations for a long time can often produce the same impulse as another which produces large accelerations for a short time. However, when launching from a planet, tiny accelerations cannot overcome the planet's gravitational pull and so cannot be used.

Some designs however, operate without internal reaction mass by taking advantage of magnetic fields or light pressure to change the spacecraft's momentum.

=== Efficiency ===
When discussing the efficiency of a propulsion system, designers often focus on the effective use of the reaction mass, which must be carried along with the rocket and is irretrievably consumed when used. Spacecraft performance can be quantified in amount of change in momentum per unit of propellant consumed, also called specific impulse. This is a measure of the amount of impulse that can be obtained from a fixed amount of reaction mass. The higher the specific impulse, the better the efficiency. Ion propulsion engines have high specific impulse (~3000 s) and low thrust whereas chemical rockets like monopropellant or bipropellant rocket engines have a low specific impulse (~300 s) but high thrust.

The impulse per unit weight-on-Earth (typically designated by $I_\text{sp}$) has units of seconds. Because the weight on Earth of the reaction mass is often unimportant when discussing vehicles in space, specific impulse can also be discussed in terms of impulse per unit mass, with the same units as velocity (e.g., meters per second). This measure is equivalent to the effective exhaust velocity of the engine, and is typically designated $v_{e}$. Either the change in momentum per unit of propellant used by a spacecraft, or the velocity of the propellant exiting the spacecraft, can be used to measure its specific impulse. The two values differ by a factor of the standard acceleration due to gravity, g_{n}, 9.80665 m/s² ($I_\text{sp} g_\mathrm{n} = v_{e}$).

In contrast to chemical rockets, electrodynamic rockets use electric or magnetic fields to accelerate a charged propellant. The benefit of this method is that it can achieve exhaust velocities, and therefore $I_\text{sp}$, more than 10 times greater than those of a chemical engine, producing steady thrust with far less fuel. With a conventional chemical propulsion system, 2% of a rocket's total mass might make it to the destination, with the other 98% having been consumed as fuel. With an electric propulsion system, 70% of what is aboard in low Earth orbit can make it to a deep-space destination.

However, there is a trade-off. Chemical rockets transform propellants into most of the energy needed to propel them, but their electromagnetic equivalents must carry or produce the power required to create and accelerate propellants. Because there are currently practical limits on the amount of power available on a spacecraft, these engines are not suitable for launch vehicles or when a spacecraft needs a quick, large impulse, such as when it brakes to enter a capture orbit. Even so, because electrodynamic rockets offer very high $I_\text{sp}$, mission planners are increasingly willing to sacrifice power and thrust (and the extra time it will take to get a spacecraft where it needs to go) in order to save large amounts of propellant mass.

== Operating domains ==
Spacecraft operate in many areas of space. These include orbital maneuvering, interplanetary travel, and interstellar travel.

=== Orbital ===
Artificial satellites are first launched into the desired altitude by conventional liquid/solid propelled rockets, after which the satellite may use onboard propulsion systems for orbital stationkeeping. Once in the desired orbit, they often need some form of attitude control so that they are correctly pointed with respect to the Earth, the Sun, and possibly some astronomical object of interest. They are also subject to drag from the thin atmosphere, so that to stay in orbit for a long period of time some form of propulsion is occasionally necessary to make small corrections (orbital station-keeping). Many satellites need to be moved from one orbit to another from time to time, and this also requires propulsion. A satellite's useful life is usually over once it has exhausted its ability to adjust its orbit.

=== Interplanetary ===
For interplanetary travel, a spacecraft can use its engines to leave Earth's orbit. It is not explicitly necessary as the initial boost given by the rocket, gravity slingshot, monopropellant/bipropellent attitude control propulsion system are enough for the exploration of the solar system, as with New Horizons. Once it has done so, it must make its way to its destination. Current interplanetary spacecraft do this with a series of short-term trajectory adjustments. In between these adjustments, the spacecraft typically moves along its trajectory without accelerating. The most fuel-efficient means to move from one circular orbit to another is with a Hohmann transfer orbit: the spacecraft begins in a roughly circular orbit around the Sun. A short period of thrust in the direction of motion accelerates or decelerates the spacecraft into an elliptical orbit around the Sun which is tangential to its previous orbit and also to the orbit of its destination. The spacecraft falls freely along this elliptical orbit until it reaches its destination, where another short period of thrust accelerates or decelerates it to match the orbit of its destination. Special methods such as aerobraking or aerocapture are sometimes used for this final orbital adjustment.

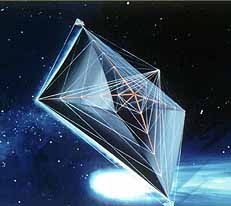
Artist's concept of a solar sail

Some spacecraft propulsion methods such as solar sails provide very low but inexhaustible thrust; an interplanetary vehicle using one of these methods would follow a rather different trajectory, either constantly thrusting against its direction of motion in order to decrease its distance from the Sun, or constantly thrusting along its direction of motion to increase its distance from the Sun. The concept has been successfully tested by the Japanese IKAROS solar sail spacecraft.

=== Interstellar ===
Because interstellar distances are great, a tremendous velocity is needed to get a spacecraft to its destination in a reasonable amount of time. Acquiring such a velocity on launch and getting rid of it on arrival remains a formidable challenge for spacecraft designers. No spacecraft capable of short duration (compared to human lifetime) interstellar travel has yet been built, but many hypothetical designs have been discussed.

== Propulsion technology ==
The four conventional and widely used types of spacecraft propulsion are cold gas, monopropellant, bipropellant, and solid motor systems. Spacecraft propulsion technology can be of several types, such as chemical, electric or nuclear. They are distinguished based on the physics of the propulsion system and how thrust is generated. Other experimental and more theoretical types are also included, depending on their technical maturity. Additionally, there may be credible meritorious in-space propulsion concepts not foreseen or reviewed at the time of publication, and which may be shown to be beneficial to future mission applications.

=== Chemical propulsion ===
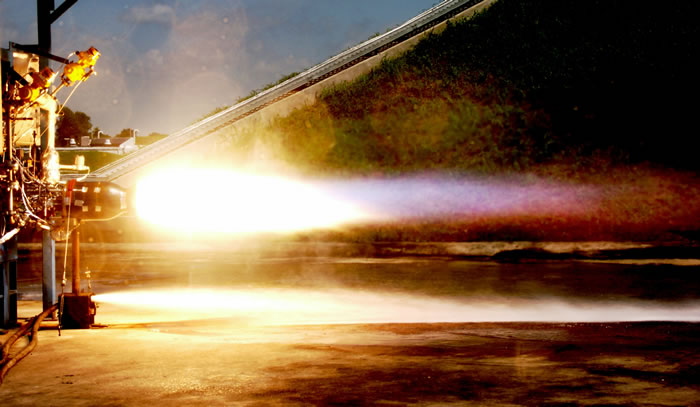
SpaceX's Kestrel engine is tested.

A large fraction of rocket engines in use today are chemical rockets; that is, they obtain the energy needed to generate thrust by chemical reactions to create a hot gas that is expanded to produce thrust. Many different propellant combinations are used to obtain these chemical reactions, including, for example, hydrazine, liquid oxygen, liquid hydrogen, nitrous oxide, and hydrogen peroxide. They can be used as a monopropellant or in bi-propellant configurations.

Rocket engines provide essentially the highest specific powers and high specific thrusts of any engine used for spacecraft propulsion. Most rocket engines are internal combustion heat engines (although non-combusting forms exist). Rocket engines generally produce a high-temperature reaction mass, as a hot gas, which is achieved by combusting a solid, liquid or gaseous fuel with an oxidiser within a combustion chamber. The extremely hot gas is then allowed to escape through a high-expansion ratio bell-shaped nozzle, a feature that gives a rocket engine its characteristic shape. The effect of the nozzle is to accelerate the mass, converting most of the thermal energy into kinetic energy, where exhaust speeds reaching as high as 10 times the speed of sound at sea level are common.

==== Green chemical propulsion ====
The dominant form of chemical propulsion for satellites has historically been hydrazine, but this fuel is highly toxic and at risk of being banned across Europe. Non-toxic 'green' alternatives are now being developed to replace hydrazine. Nitrous oxide-based alternatives are garnering traction and government support, with development being led by commercial companies Dawn Aerospace, Impulse Space, and Launcher. The first nitrous oxide-based system flown in space was by D-Orbit onboard their ION Satellite Carrier (space tug) in 2021, using six Dawn Aerospace B20 thrusters, launched upon a SpaceX Falcon 9 rocket.

=== Electric propulsion ===
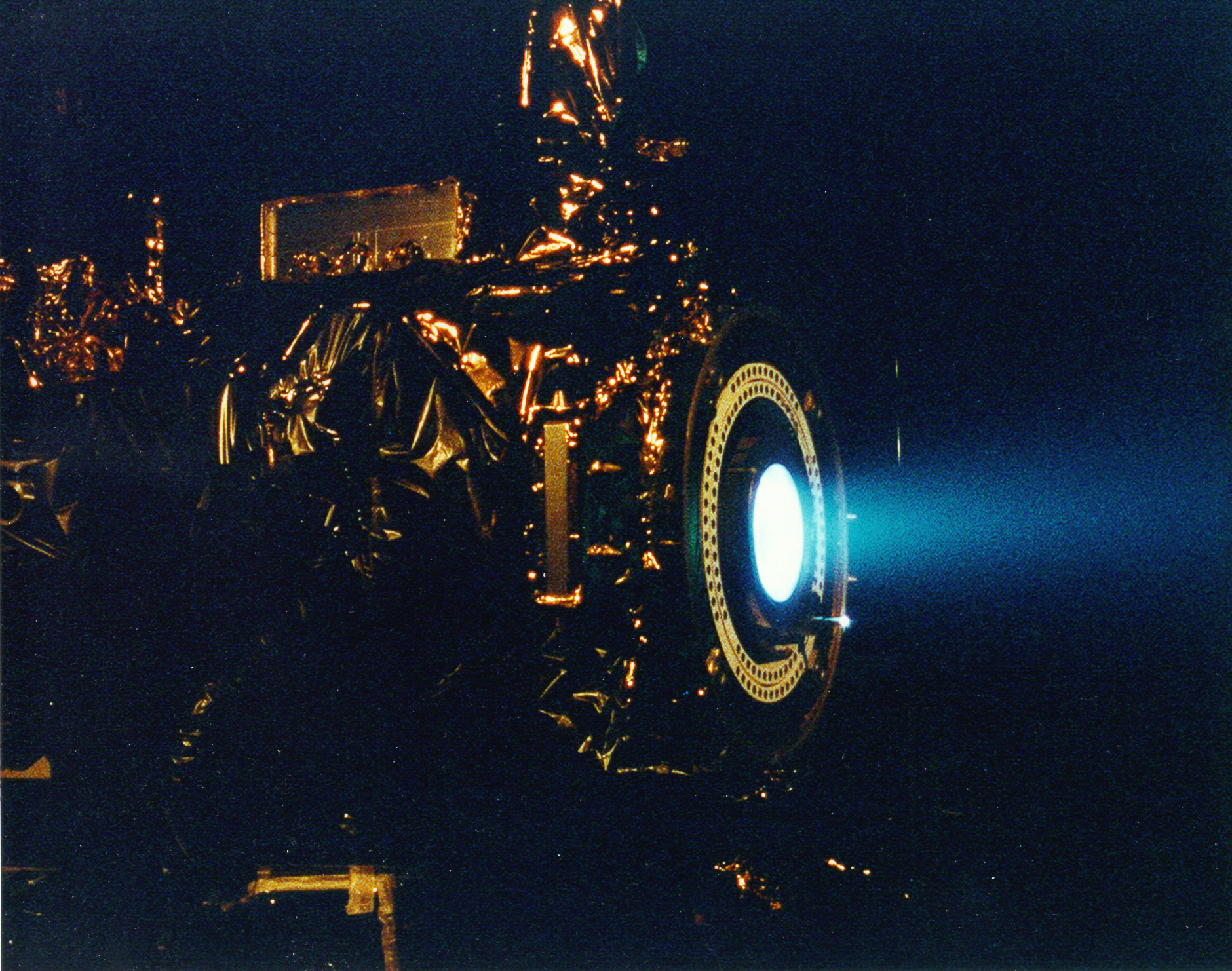
NASA's 2.3 kW NSTAR ion thruster for the Deep Space 1 spacecraft during a hot fire test at the Jet Propulsion Laboratory

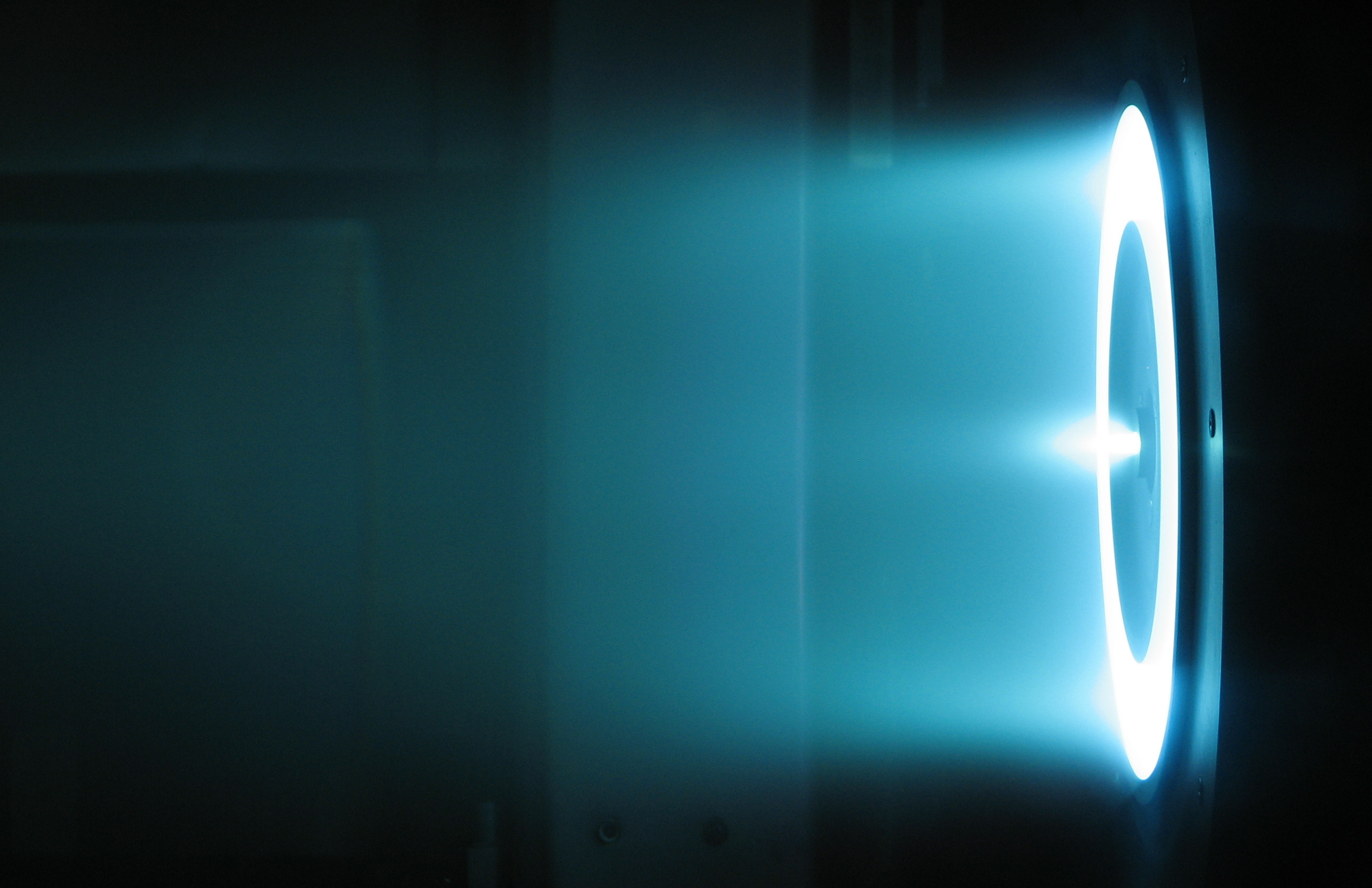
6 kW Hall thruster in operation at the NASA Jet Propulsion Laboratory

Rather than relying on high temperature and fluid dynamics to accelerate the reaction mass to high speeds, there are a variety of methods that use electrostatic or electromagnetic forces to accelerate the reaction mass directly, where the reaction mass is usually a stream of ions.

Ion propulsion rockets typically heat a plasma or charged gas inside a magnetic bottle and release it via a magnetic nozzle so that no solid matter needs to come in contact with the plasma. Such an engine uses electric power, first to ionize atoms, and then to create a voltage gradient to accelerate the ions to high exhaust velocities. For these drives, at the highest exhaust speeds, energetic efficiency and thrust are all inversely proportional to exhaust velocity. Their very high exhaust velocity means they require huge amounts of energy and thus with practical power sources provide low thrust, but use hardly any fuel.

Electric propulsion is commonly used for station keeping on commercial communications satellites and for prime propulsion on some scientific space missions because of their high specific impulse. However, they generally have very small values of thrust and therefore must be operated for long durations to provide the total impulse required by a mission.

The idea of electric propulsion dates to 1906, when Robert Goddard considered the possibility in his personal notebook. Konstantin Tsiolkovsky published the idea in 1911.

Electric propulsion methods include:

- Ion thrusters, which accelerate ions first and later neutralize the ion beam with an electron stream emitted from a cathode called a neutralizer:
  - Electrostatic ion thrusters
  - Field-emission electric propulsion
  - MagBeam thrusters
  - Hall-effect thrusters
  - Colloid thrusters
- Electrothermal thrusters, wherein electromagnetic fields are used to generate a plasma to increase the heat of the bulk propellant, and the thermal energy imparted to the propellant gas is then converted into kinetic energy by a nozzle of either physical material construction or by magnetic means:
  - Arcjets using DC current or microwaves
  - Helicon double-layer thrusters
  - Resistojets
- Electromagnetic thrusters, wherein ions are accelerated either by the Lorentz force or by the effect of electromagnetic fields where the electric field is not in the direction of the acceleration:
  - Plasma propulsion engines
  - Magnetoplasmadynamic thrusters
  - Electrodeless plasma thrusters
  - Pulsed inductive thrusters
  - Pulsed plasma thrusters
  - Variable specific impulse magnetoplasma rockets (VASIMR)
  - Vacuum arc thrusters
- Mass drivers designed for propulsion.

==== Power sources ====
Electrical propulsion can be powered by solar energy or nuclear power. Solar system use solar cells to generate electricity directly; nuclear systems create heat which is converted to electricity, either statically (at efficiency <10%) or dynamically (20-30%). Dynamics system need to be large to be practical. Electric rockets drawing their power from a nuclear source are called nuclear electric rockets.

Chemical power generators are not used due to the far lower total available energy.

With any current source of electrical power, chemical, nuclear or solar, the maximum amount of power that can be generated limits the amount of thrust that can be produced to a small value. Power generation adds significant mass to the spacecraft, and ultimately the weight of the power source limits the performance of the vehicle.

=== Nuclear propulsion ===
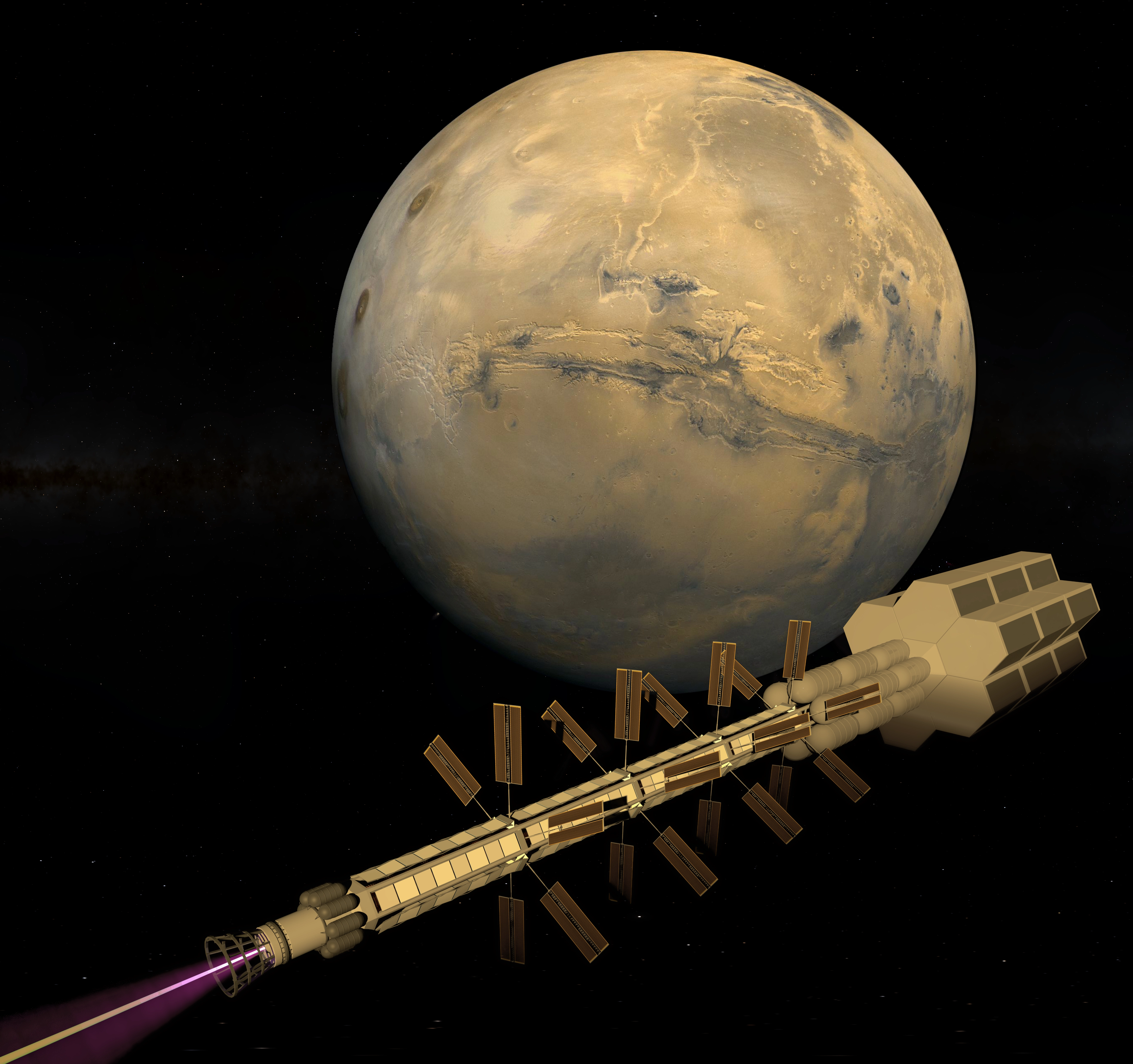
3D sketch of an electromagnetic propulsion fusion plasma thruster

Nuclear fuels typically have very high specific energy, much higher than chemical fuels, which means that they can generate large amounts of energy per unit mass. This makes them valuable in spaceflight, as it can enable high specific impulses, sometimes even at high thrusts. The machinery to do this is complex, but research has developed methods for their use in propulsion systems, and some have been tested in a laboratory.

Here, nuclear propulsion moreso refers to the source of propulsion being nuclear, instead of a nuclear electric rocket where a nuclear reactor would provide power (instead of solar panels) for other types of electrical propulsion.

Nuclear propulsion methods include:

- Fission-fragment rockets
- Fission sails
- Fusion rockets
- Nuclear thermal rockets (NTR)
- Nuclear pulse propulsion
- Nuclear salt-water rockets
- Radioisotope rockets

=== Propulsion without internal reaction mass ===
Propellantless spacecraft propulsion is any spacecraft propulsion system that accelerates the craft by interacting with the environment rather than expelling on-board propellant. Systems that have been demonstrated include gravity assist for satellite trajectories in a gravitational field, aerobraking using atmospheric drag, solar sails using radiation pressure from the Sun, and electrodynamic tethers leveraging a planet's magnetic field with a long wire. Other propellantless systems are only exploratory concepts.

The concept of a gravity assist is a form of propulsion to carry a space probe onward to other destinations without the expense of reaction mass; harnessing the gravitational energy of other celestial objects allows the spacecraft to gain kinetic energy. However, more energy can be obtained from the gravity assist if rockets are used via the Oberth effect.

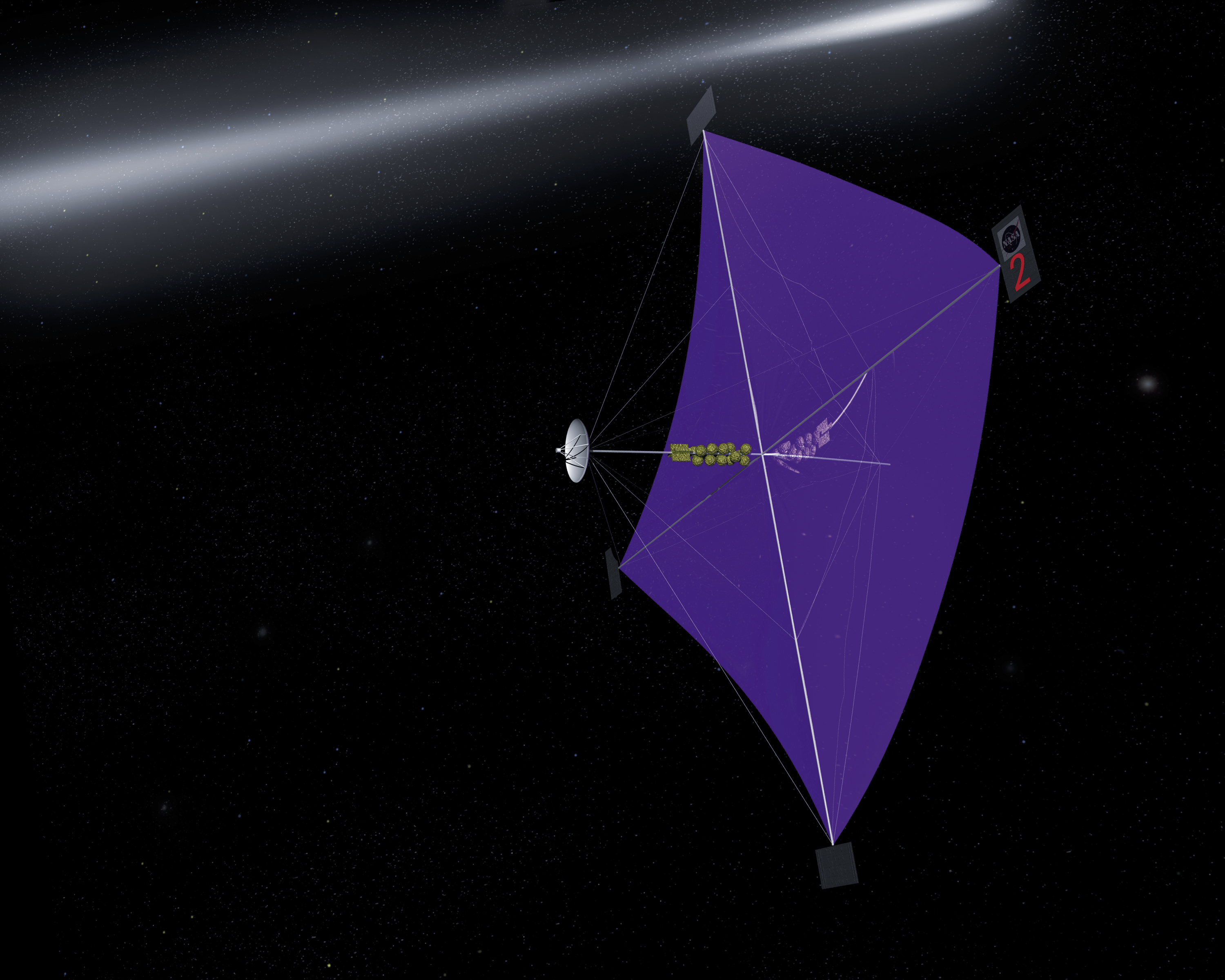
NASA study of a solar sail. The sail would be half a kilometer wide.

The concept of solar sails rely on radiation pressure from electromagnetic energy, but they require a large collection surface to function effectively. Japan launched a solar sail-powered spacecraft, IKAROS in May 2010, which successfully demonstrated propulsion and guidance until the mission ended in 2025. As further proof of the solar sail concept, NanoSail-D became the first such powered satellite to orbit Earth. As of August 2017, NASA confirmed the Sunjammer solar sail project was concluded in 2014 with lessons learned for future space sail projects. The U.K. Cubesail programme will be the first mission to demonstrate solar sailing in low Earth orbit, and the first mission to demonstrate full three-axis attitude control of a solar sail.

A tether propulsion system employs a long cable with a high tensile strength to change a spacecraft's orbit, such as by interaction with a planet's magnetic field or through momentum exchange with another object.

Magnetic sails deflect charged particles from the solar wind with a magnetic field, thereby imparting momentum to the spacecraft. For instance, the so-called Magsail is a large superconducting loop proposed for acceleration/deceleration in the solar wind and deceleration in the Interstellar medium. A variant is the mini-magnetospheric plasma propulsion system and its successor, the magnetoplasma sail, which inject plasma at a low rate to enhance the magnetic field to more effectively deflect charged particles in a plasma wind.

Beam-powered propulsion is another method of propulsion without reaction mass, and includes sails pushed by laser, microwave, or particle beams. Beamed power to the spacecraft is considered to have potential, according to NASA and the University of Colorado Boulder.

=== Advanced propulsion technology ===
Advanced, and in some cases theoretical, propulsion technologies may use chemical or nonchemical physics to produce thrust but are generally considered to be of lower technical maturity with challenges that have not been overcome. For both human and robotic exploration, traversing the solar system is a struggle against time and distance. The most distant planets are 4.5–6 billion kilometers from the Sun and to reach them in any reasonable time requires much more capable propulsion systems than conventional chemical rockets. Rapid inner solar system missions with flexible launch dates are difficult, requiring propulsion systems that are beyond today's current state of the art. The logistics, and therefore the total system mass required to support sustained human exploration beyond Earth to destinations such as the Moon, Mars, or near-Earth objects, are daunting unless more efficient in-space propulsion technologies are developed and fielded.

A variety of hypothetical propulsion techniques have been considered that require a deeper understanding of the properties of space, particularly inertial frames and the vacuum state. Such methods are highly speculative and include:

- Black hole starship
- Differential sail
- Gravitational shielding
- Field propulsion
  - Diametric drive
  - Disjunction drive
  - Pitch drive
  - Bias drive
- Photon rocket
- Quantum vacuum thruster
- Nano electrokinetic thruster
- Reactionless drive
  - Abraham—Minkowski drive
  - Alcubierre drive
  - Dean drive
  - EmDrive
  - Heim theory
  - Woodward effect

A NASA assessment of its Breakthrough Propulsion Physics Program divides such proposals into those that are non-viable for propulsion purposes, those that are of uncertain potential, and those that are not impossible according to current theories.

=== Table of methods ===
Below is a summary of some of the more popular, proven technologies, followed by increasingly speculative methods. Four numbers are shown. The first is the effective exhaust velocity: the equivalent speed which the propellant leaves the vehicle. This is not necessarily the most important characteristic of the propulsion method; thrust and power consumption and other factors can be. However,

- if the delta-v is much more than the exhaust velocity, then exorbitant amounts of fuel are necessary (see the section on calculations, above), and
- if it is much more than the delta-v, then, proportionally more energy is needed; if the power is limited, as with solar energy, this means that the journey takes a proportionally longer time.

The second and third are the typical amounts of thrust and the typical burn times of the method; outside a gravitational potential, small amounts of thrust applied over a long period will give the same effect as large amounts of thrust over a short period, if the object is not significantly influenced by gravity. The fourth is the maximum delta-v the technique can give without staging. For rocket-like propulsion systems, this is a function of mass fraction and exhaust velocity; mass fraction for rocket-like systems is usually limited by propulsion system weight and tankage weight. For a system to achieve this limit, the payload may need to be a negligible percentage of the vehicle, and so the practical limit on some systems can be much lower.

Propulsion methods
Method	Effective exhaust velocity (km/s)	Thrust (N)	Firing duration	Maximum delta-v (km/s)	Technology readiness level
Solid-fuel rocket	<2.5	<10^{7}	Minutes	7	9: Flight proven
Hybrid rocket	<4		Minutes	>3	9: Flight proven
Monopropellant rocket	1–3	0.1–400	Milliseconds–minutes	3	9: Flight proven
Liquid-fuel rocket	<4.4	<10^{7}	Minutes	9	9: Flight proven
Electrostatic ion thruster	15–210		Months–years	>100	9: Flight proven
Hall-effect thruster (HET)	up to 50		Months–years	>100	9: Flight proven
Resistojet rocket	2–6	10^{−2}–10	Minutes	?	8: Flight qualified
Arcjet rocket	4–16	10^{−2}–10	Minutes	?	8: Flight qualified
Field-emission electric propulsion (FEEP)	100–130	10^{−6}–10^{−3}	Months–years	?	8: Flight qualified
Pulsed plasma thruster (PPT)	20	0.1	80–400 days	?	7: Prototype demonstrated in space
Dual-mode propulsion rocket	1–4.7	0.1–10^{7}	Milliseconds–minutes	3–9	7: Prototype demonstrated in space
Solar sails	299,792.458, Speed of light	9.08/km^{2} at 1 AU; 908/km^{2} at 0.1 AU; 10^{−10}/km^{2} at 4 ly	Indefinite	>40	9: Light pressure attitude-control flight proven; 6: Model, 196 m^{2} 1.12 mN 400 m/s delta-v demonstrated in interplanetary space
Tripropellant rocket	2.5–5.3	0.1–10^{7}	Minutes	9	6: Prototype demonstrated on ground
Magnetoplasmadynamic thruster (MPD)	20–100	100	Weeks	?	6: Model, 1 kW demonstrated in space
Nuclear–thermal rocket	9	10^{7}	Minutes	>20	6: Prototype demonstrated on ground
Propulsive mass drivers	0–30	10^{4}–10^{8}	Months	?	6: Model, 32 MJ demonstrated on ground
Tether propulsion	—N/a	1–10^{12}	Minutes	7	6: Model, 31.7 km demonstrated in space
Air-augmented rocket	5–6	0.1–10^{7}	Seconds–minutes	>7?	6: Prototype demonstrated on ground
Liquid-air-cycle engine	4.5	10^{3}–10^{7}	Seconds–minutes	?	6: Prototype demonstrated on ground
Pulsed-inductive thruster (PIT)	10–80	20	Months	?	5: Component validated in vacuum
Variable-specific-impulse magnetoplasma rocket (VASIMR)	10–300	40–1,200	Days–months	>100	5: Component, 200 kW validated in vacuum
Magnetic-field oscillating amplified thruster (MOA)	10–390	0.1–1	Days–months	>100	5: Component validated in vacuum
Solar–thermal rocket	7–12	1–100	Weeks	>20	4: Component validated in lab
Radioisotope rocket/Steam thruster	7–8	1.3–1.5	Months	?	4: Component validated in lab
Nuclear–electric rocket	As electric propulsion method used				4: Component, 400 kW validated in lab
Orion Project (near-term nuclear pulse propulsion)	20–100	10^{9}–10^{12}	Days	30–60	3: Validated, 900 kg proof-of-concept
Space elevator	—N/a	—N/a	Indefinite	>12	3: Validated proof-of-concept
Reaction Engines SABRE	30/4.5	0.1 – 10^{7}	Minutes	9.4	3: Validated proof-of-concept
Electric sails	145–750, solar wind	?	Indefinite	>40	3: Validated proof-of-concept
Magsail in Solar wind	—N/a	644 (Note: Divided by 3.1 correction factor.)	Indefinite	250–750	3: Validated proof-of-concept
Magnetoplasma sail in Solar wind	278	700	Months–Years	250–750	4: Component validated in lab
Magsail in Interstellar medium	—N/a	88,000 initially	Decades	15,000	3: Validated proof-of-concept
Beam-powered/laser	As propulsion method powered by beam				3: Validated, 71 m proof-of-concept
Launch loop/orbital ring	—N/a	10^{4}	Minutes	11–30	2: Technology concept formulated
Nuclear pulse propulsion (Project Daedalus' drive)	20–1,000	10^{9}–10^{12}	Years	15,000	2: Technology concept formulated
Gas-core reactor rocket	10 – 20	10^{3}–10^{6}	?	?	2: Technology concept formulated
Nuclear salt-water rocket	100	10^{3}–10^{7}	Half-hour	?	2: Technology concept formulated
Fission sail	?	?	?	?	2: Technology concept formulated
Fission-fragment rocket	15,000	?	?	?	2: Technology concept formulated
Nuclear–photonic rocket/Photon rocket	299,792.458, Speed of light	10^{−5}–1	Years–decades	?	2: Technology concept formulated
Fusion rocket	100–1,000	?	?	?	2: Technology concept formulated
Antimatter-catalyzed nuclear pulse propulsion	200–4,000	?	Days–weeks	?	2: Technology concept formulated
Antimatter rocket	10,000–100,000	?	?	?	2: Technology concept formulated
Bussard ramjet	2.2–20,000	?	Indefinite	30,000	2: Technology concept formulated
Method	Effective exhaust velocity (km/s)	Thrust (N)	Firing duration	Maximum delta-v (km/s)	Technology readiness level

Table Notes

== Planetary and atmospheric propulsion ==
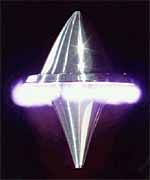
A successful proof of concept Lightcraft test, a subset of beam-powered propulsion

=== Launch-assist mechanisms ===
There have been many ideas proposed for launch-assist mechanisms that have the potential of substantially reducing the cost of getting to orbit. Proposed non-rocket spacelaunch launch-assist mechanisms include:

- Skyhook (requires reusable suborbital launch vehicle, not feasible using presently available materials)
- Space elevator (tether from Earth's surface to geostationary orbit, cannot be built with existing materials)
- Launch loop (a very fast enclosed rotating loop about 80 km tall)
- Space fountain (a very tall building held up by a stream of masses fired from its base)
- Orbital ring (a ring around Earth with spokes hanging down off bearings)
- Electromagnetic catapult (railgun, coilgun) (an electric gun)
- Rocket sled launch
- Space gun (Project HARP, ram accelerator) (a chemically powered gun)
- Beam-powered propulsion rockets and jets powered from the ground via a beam
- High-altitude platforms to assist initial stage

=== Air-breathing engines ===
Studies generally show that conventional air-breathing engines, such as ramjets or turbojets are basically too heavy (have too low a thrust/weight ratio) to give significant performance improvement when installed on a launch vehicle. However, launch vehicles can be air launched from separate lift vehicles (e.g. B-29, Pegasus Rocket and White Knight) which do use such propulsion systems. Jet engines mounted on a launch rail could also be so used.

On the other hand, very lightweight or very high-speed engines have been proposed that take advantage of the air during ascent:

- SABRE – a lightweight hydrogen fuelled turbojet with precooler
- ATREX – a lightweight hydrogen fuelled turbojet with precooler
- Liquid air cycle engine – a hydrogen-fuelled jet engine that liquifies the air before burning it in a rocket engine
- Scramjet – jet engines that use supersonic combustion
- Shcramjet – similar to a scramjet engine, however it takes advantage of shockwaves produced from the aircraft in the combustion chamber to assist in increasing overall efficiency.

Normal rocket launch vehicles fly almost vertically before rolling over at an altitude of some tens of kilometers before burning sideways for orbit; this initial vertical climb wastes propellant but is optimal as it greatly reduces airdrag. Airbreathing engines burn propellant much more efficiently and this would permit a far flatter launch trajectory. The vehicles would typically fly approximately tangentially to Earth's surface until leaving the atmosphere then perform a rocket burn to bridge the final delta-v to orbital velocity.

For spacecraft already in very low-orbit, air-breathing electric propulsion could use residual gases in the upper atmosphere as a propellant. Air-breathing electric propulsion could make a new class of long-lived, low-orbiting missions feasible on Earth, Mars or Venus.

=== Planetary arrival and landing ===
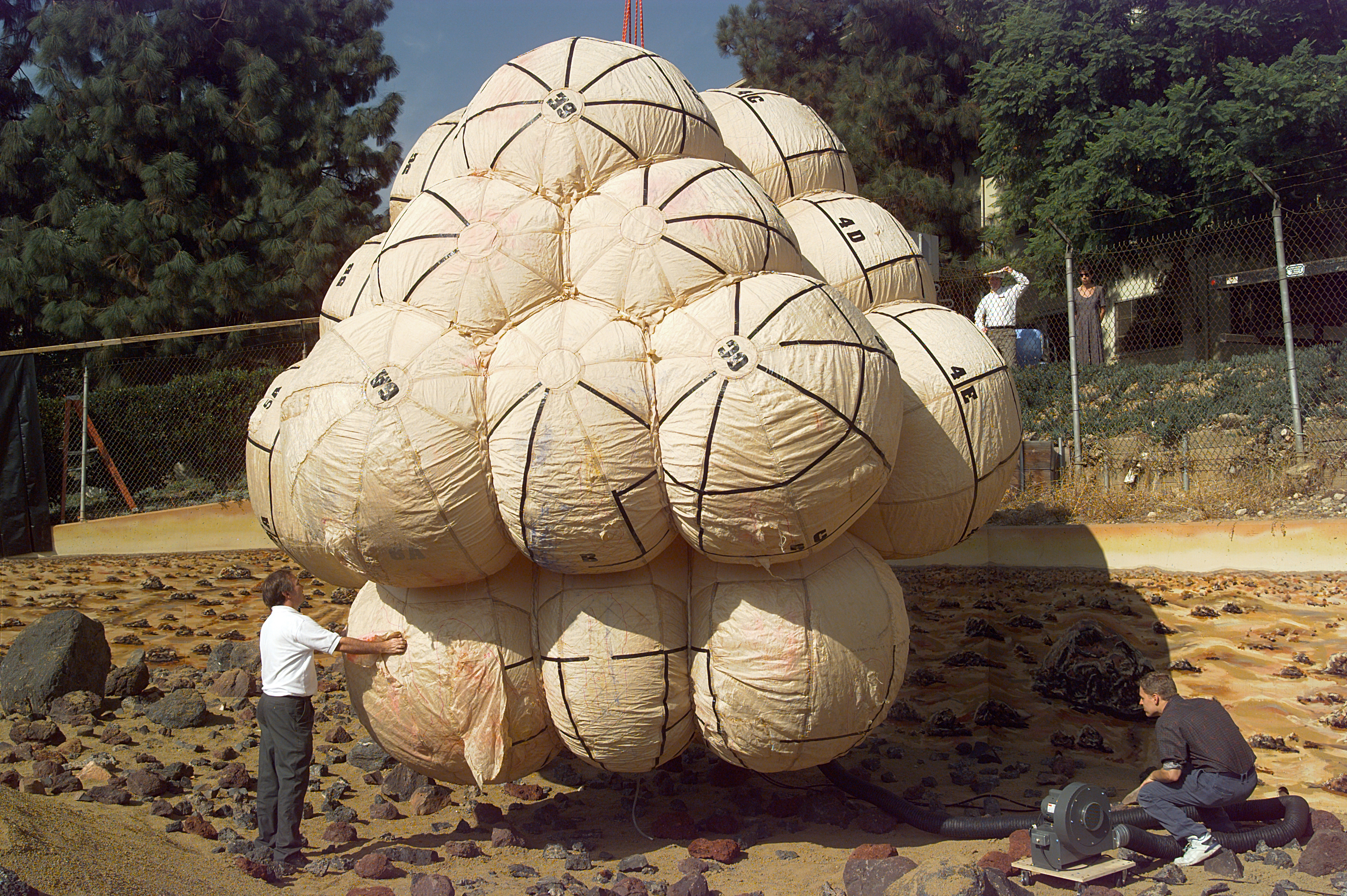
A test version of the Mars Pathfinder airbag system

When a vehicle is to enter orbit around its destination planet, or when it is to land, it must adjust its velocity. This can be done using any of the methods listed above (provided they can generate a high enough thrust), but there are methods that can take advantage of planetary atmospheres and/or surfaces.

- Aerobraking allows a spacecraft to reduce the high point of an elliptical orbit by repeated brushes with the atmosphere at the low point of the orbit. This can save a considerable amount of fuel because it takes much less delta-V to enter an elliptical orbit compared to a low circular orbit. Because the braking is done over the course of many orbits, heating is comparatively minor, and a heat shield is not required. This has been done on several Mars missions such as Mars Global Surveyor, 2001 Mars Odyssey, and Mars Reconnaissance Orbiter, and at least one Venus mission, Magellan.
- Aerocapture is a much more aggressive manoeuver, converting an incoming hyperbolic orbit to an elliptical orbit in one pass. This requires a heat shield and more controlled navigation because it must be completed in one pass through the atmosphere, and unlike aerobraking no preview of the atmosphere is possible. If the intent is to remain in orbit, then at least one more propulsive maneuver is required after aerocapture—otherwise the low point of the resulting orbit will remain in the atmosphere, resulting in eventual re-entry. Aerocapture has not yet been tried on a planetary mission, but the re-entry skip by Zond 6 and Zond 7 upon lunar return were aerocapture maneuvers, because they turned a hyperbolic orbit into an elliptical orbit. On these missions, because there was no attempt to raise the perigee after the aerocapture, the resulting orbit still intersected the atmosphere, and re-entry occurred at the next perigee.
- A ballute is an inflatable drag device.
- Parachutes can land a probe on a planet or moon with an atmosphere, usually after the atmosphere has scrubbed off most of the velocity, using a heat shield.
- Airbags can soften the final landing.
- Lithobraking, or stopping by impacting the surface, is usually done by accident. However, it may be done deliberately with the probe expected to survive (see, for example, the Deep Impact spacecraft), in which case very sturdy probes are required.

== Research ==
Development of technologies will result in technical solutions that improve thrust levels, specific impulse, power, specific mass, (or specific power), volume, system mass, system complexity, operational complexity, commonality with other spacecraft systems, manufacturability, durability, and cost. These types of improvements will yield decreased transit times, increased payload mass, safer spacecraft, and decreased costs. In some instances, the development of technologies within this technology area will result in mission-enabling breakthroughs that will revolutionize space exploration. There is no single propulsion technology that will benefit all missions or mission types; the requirements for in-space propulsion vary widely according to their intended application.

One institution focused on developing primary propulsion technologies aimed at benefitting near- and mid-term science missions by reducing cost, mass, and/or travel times is the Glenn Research Center (GRC). Electric propulsion architectures are of particular interest to the GRC, including ion and Hall thrusters. One system combines solar sails, a form of propellantless propulsion which relies on naturally occurring starlight for propulsion energy, and Hall thrusters. Other propulsion technologies being developed include advanced chemical propulsion and aerocapture.

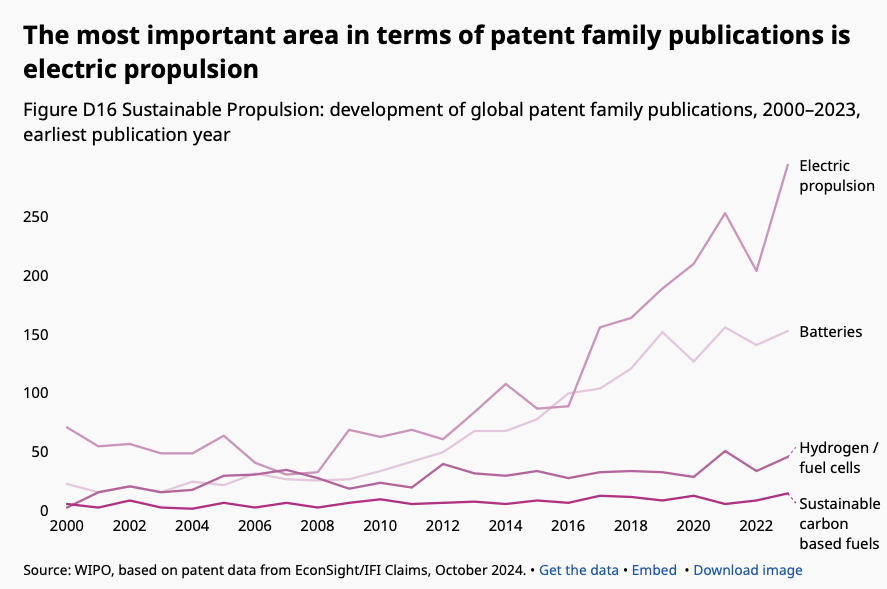
The most important area in terms of patent family publications related to sustainable propulsion is electric propulsion

Sustainable Propulsion technologies, such as solar cells and electric propulsion systems powered by renewable energy, are gaining attention for their potential to provide solutions for space travel, whilst aiming for more efficient energy sources and lesser harmful emissions. However, those technologies may be limited in terms of thrust and scalability.

In 2023, Boeing and Airbus are the leading research companies in Sustainable Propulsion for space applications in terms of patent family publications, but mostly focus on hydrogen/fuel cells and sustainable fuels. The most important area in terms of patent family publications is electric propulsion. The number of patent family publications in electric propulsion systems has increased from only 70 in 2000 to 293 in 2023, with the top inventors being from China.

=== Defining technologies ===
The term "mission pull" defines a technology or a performance characteristic necessary to meet a planned NASA mission requirement. Any other relationship between a technology and a mission (an alternate propulsion system, for example) is categorized as "technology push." Also, a space demonstration refers to the spaceflight of a scaled version of a particular technology or of a critical technology subsystem. On the other hand, a space validation would serve as a qualification flight for future mission implementation. A successful validation flight would not require any additional space testing of a particular technology before it can be adopted for a science or exploration mission.

=== Testing ===
Spacecraft propulsion systems are often first statically tested on Earth's surface, within the atmosphere but many systems require a vacuum chamber to test fully. Rockets are usually tested at a rocket engine test facility well away from habitation and other buildings for safety reasons. Ion drives are far less dangerous and require much less stringent safety, usually only a moderately large vacuum chamber is needed. Static firing of engines are done at ground test facilities, and systems which cannot be adequately tested on the ground and require launches may be employed at a launch site.

== In fiction ==
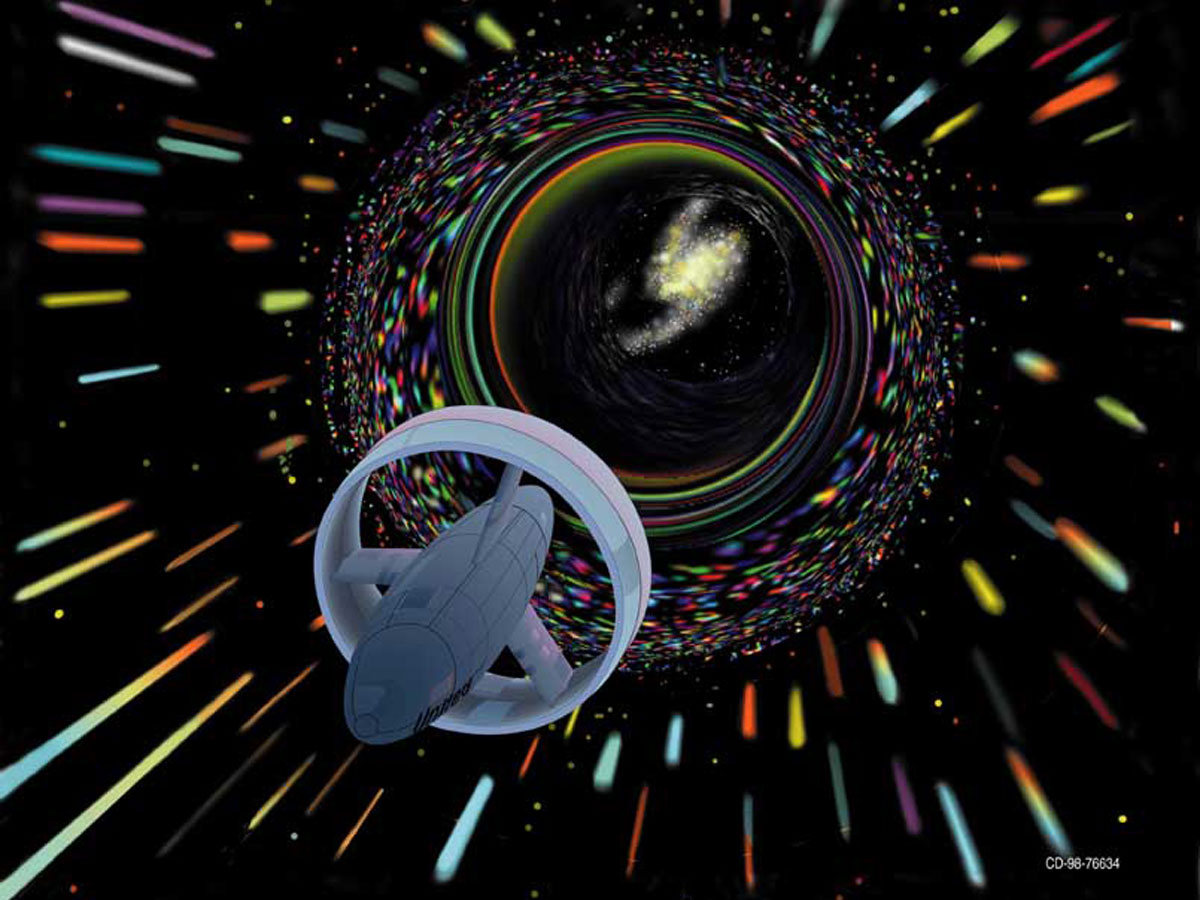
Artist's conception of a warp drive design

In science fiction, spaceships use various means to travel, some of them such as solar sails, ramjets, and warp drives are scientifically plausible; others are mostly or entirely fictitious, such as anti-gravity, spindizzy and hyperspace travel).

== See also ==
- Anti-gravity
- Artificial gravity
- Atmospheric entry
- Breakthrough Propulsion Physics Program
- Flight dynamics (spacecraft)
- Index of aerospace engineering articles
- Interplanetary Transport Network
- Interplanetary travel
- List of aerospace engineering software
- List of aerospace engineering topics
- Lists of rockets
- Orbital maneuver
- Orbital mechanics
- Pulse detonation engine
- Rocket
- Rocket engine nozzles
- Satellite
- Spaceflight
- Space launch
- Space travel using constant acceleration
- Specific impulse
- Tsiolkovsky rocket equation
