= Reaction engine =

Type of engine

A reaction engine is an engine or motor that produces thrust by expelling reaction mass (reaction propulsion), in accordance with Newton's third law of motion. This law of motion is commonly paraphrased as: "For every action force there is an equal, but opposite, reaction force."

Examples include jet engines, rocket engines, pump-jets, and more uncommon variations such as Hall effect thrusters, ion drives, mass drivers, and nuclear pulse propulsion.

== Discovery ==
The discovery of the reaction engine has been attributed to the Romanian inventor Alexandru Ciurcu and to the French journalist Just Buisson.

== Energy use ==
=== Propulsive efficiency ===
For all reaction engines that carry on-board propellant (such as rocket engines and electric propulsion drives) some energy must go into accelerating the reaction mass. Every engine wastes some energy, but even assuming 100% efficiency, the engine needs energy amounting to

$$\begin{matrix} \frac{1}{2} \end{matrix} MV_e^2$$

(where M is the mass of propellent expended and $V_e$ is the exhaust velocity), which is simply the energy to accelerate the exhaust.

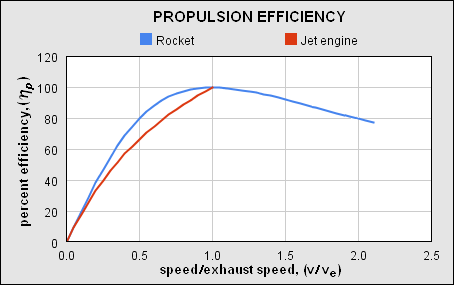
Due to energy carried away in the exhaust the energy efficiency of a reaction engine varies with the speed of the exhaust relative to the speed of the vehicle, this is called propulsive efficiency, blue is the curve for rocket-like reaction engines, red is for air-breathing (duct) reaction engines

Comparing the rocket equation (which shows how much energy ends up in the final vehicle) and the above equation (which shows the total energy required) shows that even with 100% engine efficiency, certainly not all energy supplied ends up in the vehicle – some of it, indeed usually most of it, ends up as kinetic energy of the exhaust.

If the specific impulse ($I_{sp}$) is fixed, for a mission delta-v, there is a particular $I_{sp}$ that minimises the overall energy used by the rocket. This comes to an exhaust velocity of about two-thirds of the mission delta-v (see the energy computed from the rocket equation). Drives with a specific impulse that is both high and fixed such as Ion thrusters have exhaust velocities that can be enormously higher than this ideal, and thus end up powersource limited and give very low thrust. Where the vehicle performance is power limited, e.g. if solar power or nuclear power is used, then in the case of a large $v_{e}$ the maximum acceleration is inversely proportional to it. Hence the time to reach a required delta-v is proportional to $v_{e}$. Thus the latter should not be too large.

On the other hand, if the exhaust velocity can be made to vary so that at each instant it is equal and opposite to the vehicle velocity then the absolute minimum energy usage is achieved. When this is achieved, the exhaust stops in space (Note: With things moving around in orbits and nothing staying still, the question may be quite reasonably asked, stationary relative to what? The answer is for the energy to be zero (and in the absence of gravity which complicates the issue somewhat), the exhaust must stop relative to the initial motion of the rocket before the engines were switched on. It is possible to do calculations from other reference frames, but consideration for the kinetic energy of the exhaust and propellant needs to be given. In Newtonian mechanics the initial position of the rocket is the centre of mass frame for the rocket/propellant/exhaust, and has the minimum energy of any frame.) and has no kinetic energy; and the propulsive efficiency is 100% all the energy ends up in the vehicle (in principle such a drive would be 100% efficient, in practice there would be thermal losses from within the drive system and residual heat in the exhaust). However, in most cases this uses an impractical quantity of propellant, but is a useful theoretical consideration.

Some drives (such as VASIMR or electrodeless plasma thruster) actually can significantly vary their exhaust velocity. This can help reduce propellant usage and improve acceleration at different stages of the flight. However the best energetic performance and acceleration is still obtained when the exhaust velocity is close to the vehicle speed. Proposed ion and plasma drives usually have exhaust velocities enormously higher than that ideal (in the case of VASIMR the lowest quoted speed is around 15 km/s compared to a mission delta-v from high Earth orbit to Mars of about 4 km/s).

For a mission, for example, when launching from or landing on a planet, the effects of gravitational attraction and any atmospheric drag must be overcome by using fuel. It is typical to combine the effects of these and other effects into an effective mission delta-v. For example, a launch mission to low Earth orbit requires about 9.3–10 km/s delta-v. These mission delta-vs are typically numerically integrated on a computer.

=== Cycle efficiency ===
All reaction engines lose some energy, mostly as heat.

Different reaction engines have different efficiencies and losses. For example, rocket engines can be up to 60–70% energy efficient in terms of accelerating the propellant. The rest is lost as heat and thermal radiation, primarily in the exhaust.

=== Oberth effect ===
Reaction engines are more energy efficient when they emit their reaction mass when the vehicle is travelling at high speed.

This is because the useful mechanical energy generated is simply force times distance, and when a thrust force is generated while the vehicle moves, then:

$$E = F \times d \;$$

where F is the force and d is the distance moved.

Dividing by length of time of motion we get:

$$\frac E t = P =  \frac {F \times d} t = F \times v$$

Hence:

$$P = F \times v \;$$

where P is the useful power and v is the speed.

Hence, v should be as high as possible, and a stationary engine does no useful work. (Note: Note, that might seem to suggest that a stationary engine would not start to move. However, at low speeds the amount of energy needed to start to move tends to zero faster than the power does. So in practice it does move, as you would expect.)

=== Delta-v and propellant ===
Rocket mass ratios versus final velocity, as calculated from the rocket equation

Exhausting the entire usable propellant of a spacecraft through the engines in a straight line in free space would produce a net velocity change to the vehicle; this number is termed delta-v ($\Delta v$).

If the exhaust velocity is constant then the total $\Delta v$ of a vehicle can be calculated using the rocket equation, where M is the mass of propellant, P is the mass of the payload (including the rocket structure), and $v_e$ is the velocity of the rocket exhaust. This is known as the Tsiolkovsky rocket equation:

$$\Delta v = v_e \ln \left(\frac{M+P}{P}\right).$$

For historical reasons, as discussed above, $v_e$ is sometimes written as

$$v_e = I_\text{sp} g_0$$

where $I_\text{sp}$ is the specific impulse of the rocket, measured in seconds, and $g_0$ is the gravitational acceleration at sea level.

For a high delta-v mission, the majority of the spacecraft's mass needs to be reaction mass. Because a rocket must carry all of its reaction mass, most of the initially expended reaction mass goes towards accelerating reaction mass rather than payload. If the rocket has a payload of mass P, the spacecraft needs to change its velocity by $\Delta v$, and the rocket engine has exhaust velocity v_{e}, then the reaction mass M which is needed can be calculated using the rocket equation and the formula for $I_\text{sp}$:

$$M = P \left(e^\frac{\Delta v}{v_e} - 1\right).$$

For $\Delta v$ much smaller than v_{e}, this equation is roughly linear, and little reaction mass is needed. If $\Delta v$ is comparable to v_{e}, then there needs to be about twice as much fuel as combined payload and structure (which includes engines, fuel tanks, and so on). Beyond this, the growth is exponential; speeds much higher than the exhaust velocity require very high ratios of fuel mass to payload and structural mass.

For a mission, for example, when launching from or landing on a planet, the effects of gravitational attraction and any atmospheric drag must be overcome by using fuel. It is typical to combine the effects of these and other effects into an effective mission delta-v. For example, a launch mission to low Earth orbit requires about 9.3–10 km/s delta-v. These mission delta-vs are typically numerically integrated on a computer.

Some effects such as Oberth effect can only be significantly utilised by high thrust engines such as rockets; i.e., engines that can produce a high g-force (thrust per unit mass, equal to delta-v per unit time).

=== Energy ===
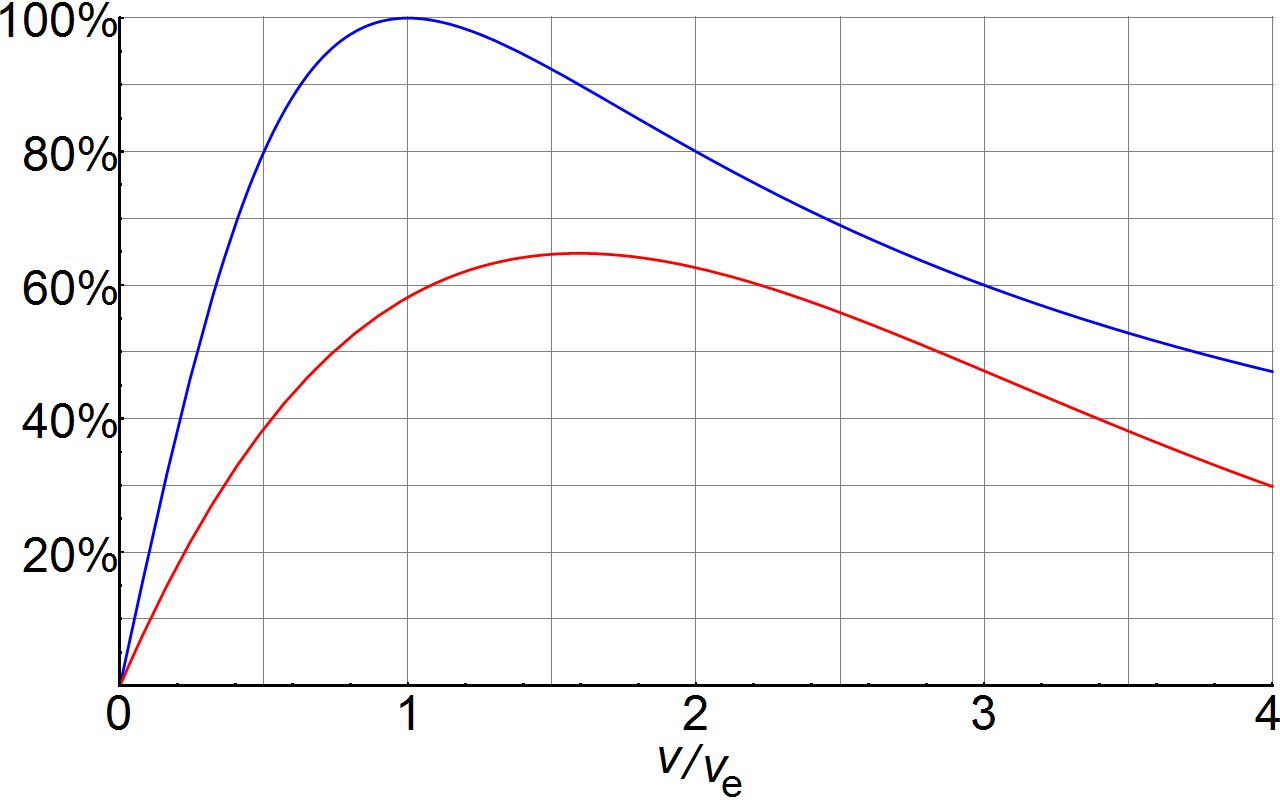
Plot of instantaneous propulsive efficiency (blue) and overall efficiency for a vehicle accelerating from rest (red) as percentages of the engine efficiency

In the ideal case $m_1$ is useful payload and $m_0-m_1$ is reaction mass (this corresponds to empty tanks having no mass, etc.). The energy required can simply be computed as

$$\frac{1}{2}(m_0 - m_1)v_\text{e}^2$$

This corresponds to the kinetic energy the expelled reaction mass would have at a speed equal to the exhaust speed. If the reaction mass had to be accelerated from zero speed to the exhaust speed, all energy produced would go into the reaction mass and nothing would be left for kinetic energy gain by the rocket and payload. However, if the rocket already moves and accelerates (the reaction mass is expelled in the direction opposite to the direction in which the rocket moves) less kinetic energy is added to the reaction mass. To see this, if, for example, $v_e$=10 km/s and the speed of the rocket is 3 km/s, then the speed of a small amount of expended reaction mass changes from 3 km/s forwards to 7 km/s rearwards. Thus, although the energy required is 50 MJ per kg reaction mass, only 20 MJ is used for the increase in speed of the reaction mass. The remaining 30 MJ is the increase of the kinetic energy of the rocket and payload.

In general:

$$d\left(\frac{1}{2}v^2\right) =
vdv = vv_\text{e}\frac{dm}{m} =
\frac{1}{2}\left[v_\text{e}^2 - \left(v - v_\text{e}\right)^2 + v^2\right]\frac{dm}{m}$$

Thus the specific energy gain of the rocket in any small time interval is the energy gain of the rocket including the remaining fuel, divided by its mass, where the energy gain is equal to the energy produced by the fuel minus the energy gain of the reaction mass. The larger the speed of the rocket, the smaller the energy gain of the reaction mass; if the rocket speed is more than half of the exhaust speed the reaction mass even loses energy on being expelled, to the benefit of the energy gain of the rocket; the larger the speed of the rocket, the larger the energy loss of the reaction mass.

We have

$$\Delta \epsilon =  \int v\, d (\Delta v)$$

where $\epsilon$ is the specific energy of the rocket (potential plus kinetic energy) and $\Delta v$ is a separate variable, not just the change in $v$. In the case of using the rocket for deceleration; i.e., expelling reaction mass in the direction of the velocity, $v$ should be taken negative.

The formula is for the ideal case again, with no energy lost on heat, etc. The latter causes a reduction of thrust, so it is a disadvantage even when the objective is to lose energy (deceleration).

If the energy is produced by the mass itself, as in a chemical rocket, the fuel value has to be $\scriptstyle{v_\text{e}^2/2}$, where for the fuel value also the mass of the oxidizer has to be taken into account. A typical value is $v_\text{e}$ = 4.5 km/s, corresponding to a fuel value of 10.1 MJ/kg. The actual fuel value is higher, but much of the energy is lost as waste heat in the exhaust that the nozzle was unable to extract.

The required energy $E$ is

$$E = \frac{1}{2}m_1\left(e^\frac{\Delta v}{v_\text{e}} - 1\right)v_\text{e}^2$$

Conclusions:

- for $\Delta v \ll v_e$ we have $E \approx \frac{1}{2}m_1 v_\text{e} \Delta v$
- for a given $\Delta v$, the minimum energy is needed if $v_\text{e} = 0.6275 \Delta v$, requiring an energy of

$$E = 0.772 m_1(\Delta v)^2$$.
In the case of acceleration in a fixed direction, and starting from zero speed, and in the absence of other forces, this is 54.4% more than just the final kinetic energy of the payload. In this optimal case the initial mass is 4.92 times the final mass.

These results apply for a fixed exhaust speed.

Due to the Oberth effect and starting from a nonzero speed, the required potential energy needed from the propellant may be less than the increase in energy in the vehicle and payload. This can be the case when the reaction mass has a lower speed after being expelled than before – rockets are able to liberate some or all of the initial kinetic energy of the propellant.

Also, for a given objective such as moving from one orbit to another, the required $\Delta v$ may depend greatly on the rate at which the engine can produce $\Delta v$ and maneuvers may even be impossible if that rate is too low. For example, a launch to Low Earth orbit (LEO) normally requires a $\Delta v$ of ca. 9.5 km/s (mostly for the speed to be acquired), but if the engine could produce $\Delta v$ at a rate of only slightly more than g, it would be a slow launch requiring altogether a very large $\Delta v$ (think of hovering without making any progress in speed or altitude, it would cost a $\Delta v$ of 9.8 m/s each second). If the possible rate is only $g$ or less, the maneuver can not be carried out at all with this engine.

The power is given by

$$P = \frac{1}{2} m a v_\text{e} = \frac{1}{2}F v_\text{e}$$

where $F$ is the thrust and $a$ the acceleration due to it. Thus the theoretically possible thrust per unit power is 2 divided by the specific impulse in m/s. The thrust efficiency is the actual thrust as percentage of this.

If, e.g., solar power is used, this restricts $a$; in the case of a large $v_\text{e}$ the possible acceleration is inversely proportional to it, hence the time to reach a required delta-v is proportional to $v_\text{e}$; with 100% efficiency:

- for $\Delta v \ll v_\text{e}$ we have $t\approx \frac{m v_\text{e} \Delta v}{2P}$

Examples:

- power, 1000 W; mass, 100 kg; $\Delta v$ = 5 km/s, $v_\text{e}$ = 16 km/s, takes 1.5 months.
- power, 1000 W; mass, 100 kg; $\Delta v$ = 5 km/s, $v_\text{e}$ = 50 km/s, takes 5 months.

Thus $v_\text{e}$ should not be too large.

=== Power to thrust ratio ===
The power to thrust ratio is simply:

$$\frac{P}{F} = \frac{\frac{1}{2} {\dot m v^2}}{\dot m v} = \frac{1}{2} v$$

Thus for any vehicle power P, the thrust that may be provided is:

$$F = \frac{P}{\frac{1}{2} v} = \frac{2 P} v$$

=== Example ===
Suppose a 10,000 kg space probe will be sent to Mars. The required $\Delta v$ from LEO is approximately 3000 m/s, using a Hohmann transfer orbit. For the sake of argument, assume the following thrusters are options to be used:

Engine	Effective exhaust velocity (km/s)	Specific impulse (s)	Mass, propellant (kg)	Energy required (GJ)	Specific energy, propellant (J/kg)	Minimum (Note: Assuming 100% energetic efficiency; 50% is more typical in practice.) power/thrust	Power generator mass/thrust (Note: Assumes a specific power of 1 kW/kg)
Solid rocket	1	100	190,000	95	500×10^{3}	0.5 kW/N	—N/a
Bipropellant rocket	5	500	8,200	103	12.6×10^{6}	2.5 kW/N	—N/a
Ion thruster	50	5,000	620	775	1.25×10^{9}	25 kW/N	25 kg/N

Observe that the more fuel-efficient engines can use far less fuel; their mass is almost negligible (relative to the mass of the payload and the engine itself) for some of the engines. However, these require a large total amount of energy. For Earth launch, engines require a thrust to weight ratio of more than one. To do this with the ion or more theoretical electrical drives, the engine would have to be supplied with one to several gigawatts of power, equivalent to a major metropolitan generating station. From the table it can be seen that this is clearly impractical with current power sources.

Alternative approaches include some forms of laser propulsion, where the reaction mass does not provide the energy required to accelerate it, with the energy instead being provided from an external laser or other beam-powered propulsion system. Small models of some of these concepts have flown, although the engineering problems are complex and the ground-based power systems are not a solved problem.

Instead, a much smaller, less powerful generator may be included which will take much longer to generate the total energy needed. This lower power is only sufficient to accelerate a tiny amount of fuel per second, and would be insufficient for launching from Earth. However, over long periods in orbit where there is no friction, the velocity will be finally achieved. For example, it took the SMART-1 more than a year to reach the Moon, whereas with a chemical rocket it takes a few days. Because the ion drive needs much less fuel, the total launched mass is usually lower, which typically results in a lower overall cost, but the journey takes longer.

Mission planning therefore frequently involves adjusting and choosing the propulsion system so as to minimise the total cost of the project, and can involve trading off launch costs and mission duration against payload fraction.

== Types of reaction engines ==
- Rocket-like
  - Rocket engine
  - Ion thruster
- Airbreathing
  - Turbojet
  - Turbofan
  - Pulsejet
  - Ramjet
  - Scramjet
- Liquid
  - Pump-jet
- Rotary
  - Aeolipile
- Solid exhaust
  - Mass driver

== See also ==
- Internal combustion engine
- Jet force
- Jet propulsion
- Thruster (disambiguation)
