= Thrust (disambiguation) =

Thrust is a reaction force described by Newton's Second and Third Laws.

Thrust may also refer to:

- Thrust fault, in geology
- Thrust block, a specialised form of thrust bearing used in ships
- Thrust (particle physics), a quantity that characterizes the collision of high energy particles in a collider
- Thrust bearing, particular type of rotary bearing
- Thrust (arch), a horizontal force in arch action
- ThrustSSC, and Thrust2, the land-speed record breaking cars
- Thrust (video game), a computer game
- Thrust (rapper), a Canadian hip hop artist
- Thrust (science fiction magazine), a 1973–1991 American fanzine
- Thrust (album), a Herbie Hancock fusion album
- Thrust stage, in a theatre, a portion of the stage that extends out from the proscenium into the audience
- Tongue thrust
- Pelvic thrust

== See also ==
- Thruster (disambiguation)
