= Subsonic =

Subsonic may refer to:

== Motion through a medium ==
- Any speed lower than the speed of sound within a sound-propagating medium
- Subsonic aircraft, a flying machine that flies at air speeds lower than the speed of sound
- Subsonic ammunition, a type of bullet designed to avoid creating a loud shockwave when fired
- Subsonic flight, an aircraft flight at air speeds lower than the speed of sound in air
- Subsonic and transonic wind tunnels

== Music ==
- Subsonic (album), a 2002 album by Vigleik Storaas Trio
- Subsonic (EP), a 2013 EP by Younha
- Subsonic album series:
  - Subsonic 2: Bass Terror, a 1995 album by Bill Laswell and Nicholas Bullen
  - Subsonic 3: Skinner's Black Laboratories, a 1995 album by Andy Hawkins and Justin Broadrick
- Subsonic Music Festival, an annual electronic music festival in Monkerai, Australia
- "Subsonic", a song by Com Truise on the EP Wave 1 (2014)

== See also ==
- Infrasound, sound at frequencies below the normal threshold of human hearing
