= Thruster =

Thruster may refer to:

== Propulsion devices ==
A thruster is a propulsive device used by spacecraft and watercraft for station keeping, attitude control, in the reaction control system, or long-duration, low-thrust acceleration.

- Reaction engine

=== Spacecraft thrusters ===
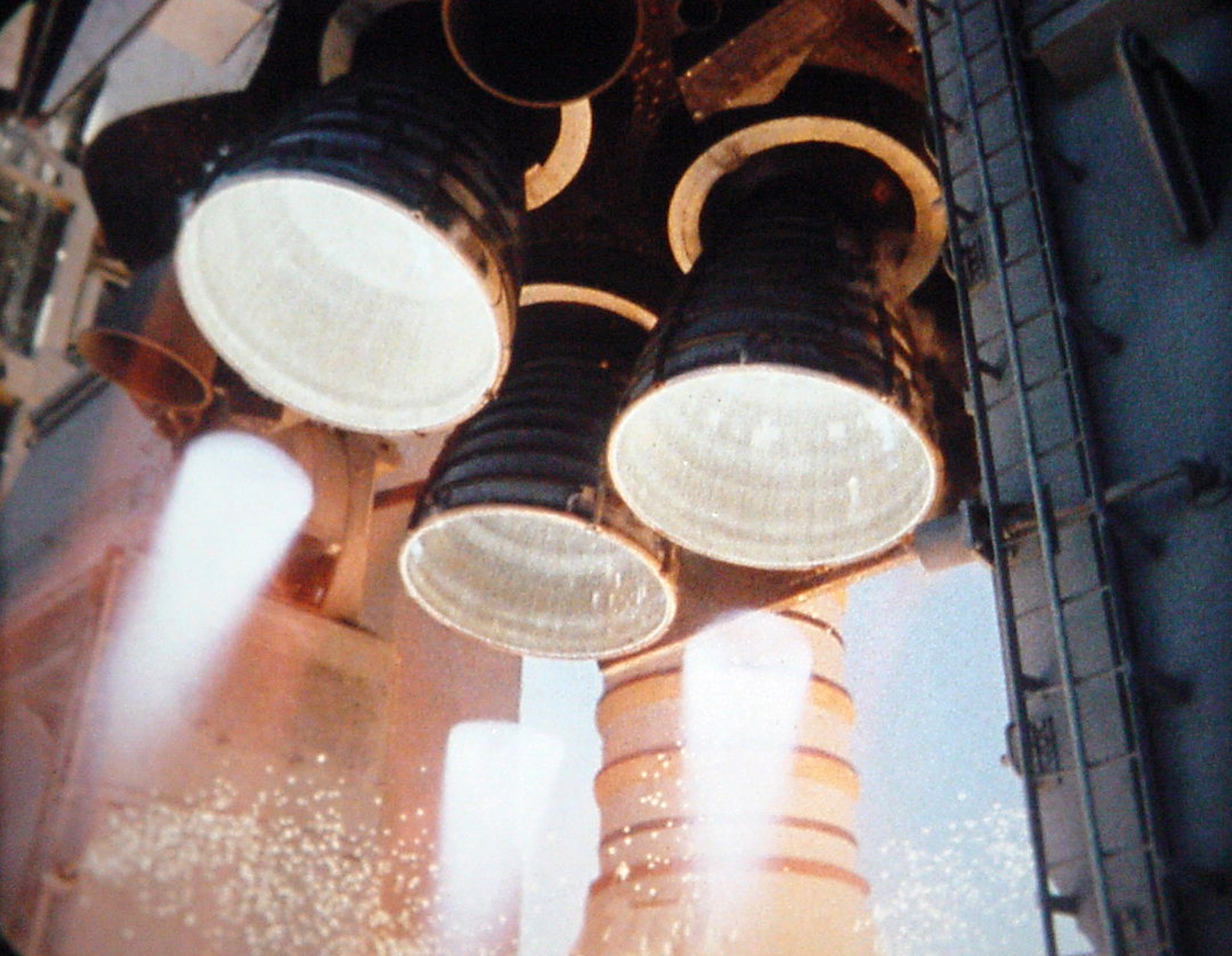
Rear thrusters of the Space Shuttle Atlantis

- Rocket engine, using exothermic chemical reactions of the propellant(s)
- Electrohydrodynamic thruster, using ionized air (only for use in an atmosphere)
- Electrostatic ion thruster, using high-voltage electrodes
- Ion thruster, using beams of ions accelerated electrically
- Hall-effect thruster, a type of ion thruster
- Pulsed inductive thruster, a pulsed form of ion thruster
- Magnetoplasmadynamic thruster, electric propulsion using the Lorentz force
- Electrodeless plasma thruster, electric propulsion using ponderomotive force
- Pulsed plasma thruster, using current arced across a solid propellant
- Plasma thruster

=== Marine thrusters ===
- Azimuth thruster, pod underneath a ship, instead of a propeller and rudder
- Bow thruster, or stern thruster, at the bow or the stern of a ship or boat
- Rim-driven thruster, electric motor and propeller combined in single unit
- Underwater Thrusters, electric motor or hydraulic motor and propeller combined in single unit to propel the ROV, AUV or UUV

== Transportation ==
- Thruster (surfing) is a surfboard fin design
- Shkadov thruster, hypothetical megascale reaction for moving a star

=== Vehicles ===
- Avio Delta Thruster, a Bulgarian ultralight trike design
- Thruster T600 Sprint, a British ultralight aircraft

== Others ==
- Hurrying, also called 'coal thrusting', a 19th-century profession
- Big Mother Thruster, hard rock band
- Thruster (exercise), a combination of a front squat and a push press (crossfit)

== See also ==
- Thrust (disambiguation)
