= State vector (navigation) =

In navigation, a state vector is a set of data describing exactly where an object is located in space, and how it is moving.

== Mathematical representation ==
A state vector typically will contain seven elements: three position coordinates, three velocity terms, and the time at which these values were valid. Mathematically, in order to describe positions in a N-dimensional space ($\mathbb{R}^N$) then a state vector $\textbf{x}$ belongs to $\mathbb{R}^{2N}$:

$$\mathbf{x}(t) = \begin{bmatrix} x_1(t)\\ x_2 (t)\\ x_3(t) \\ v_1(t) \\ v_2 (t) \\ v_3 (t) \end{bmatrix}$$

or simply

$$\mathbf{x}(t) = \begin{bmatrix} \mathbf{r}(t) \\ \mathbf{v}(t)\end{bmatrix}$$

where
$$\mathbf{r} = \begin{bmatrix} x_1 & x_2 & x_3 \end{bmatrix}^\mathsf{T}$$
is the position vector and
$$\mathbf{v} = \dot{\mathbf{r}} = \begin{bmatrix} v_1 & v_2 & v_3 \end{bmatrix}^\mathsf{T}$$
is the velocity vector.

Since there is freedom to choose coordinate systems for position, a state vector may also be expressed in a variety of coordinate systems (e.g. the North east down coordinate system).

== See also ==
- Orbital state vectors
