= Electromagnetic propulsion =

Propulsion or acceleration using electromagnetic force

Electromagnetic propulsion (EMP) is the principle of accelerating an object by the utilization of a flowing electrical current and magnetic fields. The electrical current is used to either create an opposing magnetic field, or to charge a field, which can then be repelled. When a current flows through a conductor in a magnetic field, an electromagnetic force known as a Lorentz force, pushes the conductor in a direction perpendicular to the conductor and the magnetic field. This repulsing force is what causes propulsion in a system designed to take advantage of the phenomenon. The term electromagnetic propulsion (EMP) can be described by its individual components: electromagnetic – using electricity to create a magnetic field, and propulsion – the process of propelling something. When a fluid (liquid or gas) is employed as the moving conductor, the propulsion may be termed magnetohydrodynamic drive. One key difference between EMP and propulsion achieved by electric motors is that the electrical energy used for EMP is not used to produce rotational energy for motion; though both use magnetic fields and a flowing electrical current.

The science of electromagnetic propulsion does not have origins with any one individual and has application in many different fields. The thought of using magnets for propulsion continues to this day and has been dreamed of since at least 1897 when John Munro published his fictional story "A Trip to Venus". can be seen in maglev trains and military railguns. Other applications that remain not widely used or still in development include ion thruster for low orbiting satellites and magnetohydrodynamic drive for ships and submarines.

== History ==
One of the first recorded discoveries regarding electromagnetic propulsion was in 1889 when Professor Elihu Thomson made public his work with electromagnetic waves and alternating currents. A few years later Emile Bachelet proposed the idea of a metal carriage levitated in air above the rails in a modern railway, which he showcased in the early 1890s. In the 1960s Eric Roberts Laithwaite developed the linear induction motor, which built upon these principles and introduced the first practical application of electromagnetic propulsion. In 1966 James R. Powell and Gordon Danby patented the superconducting maglev transportation system, and after this engineers around the world raced to create the first high-speed rail. From 1984 to 1995 the first commercial automated maglev system ran in Birmingham. It was a low speed Maglev shuttle that ran from the Birmingham International Airport to the Birmingham International Railway System. In the USSR at the beginning of 1960th at the Institute of Hydrodynamics, Novosibirsk, Russia, prof. V.F. Minin laid down the experimental foundations of electromagnetic accelerating of bodies to hypersonic velocity.

== Uses ==
=== Trains ===
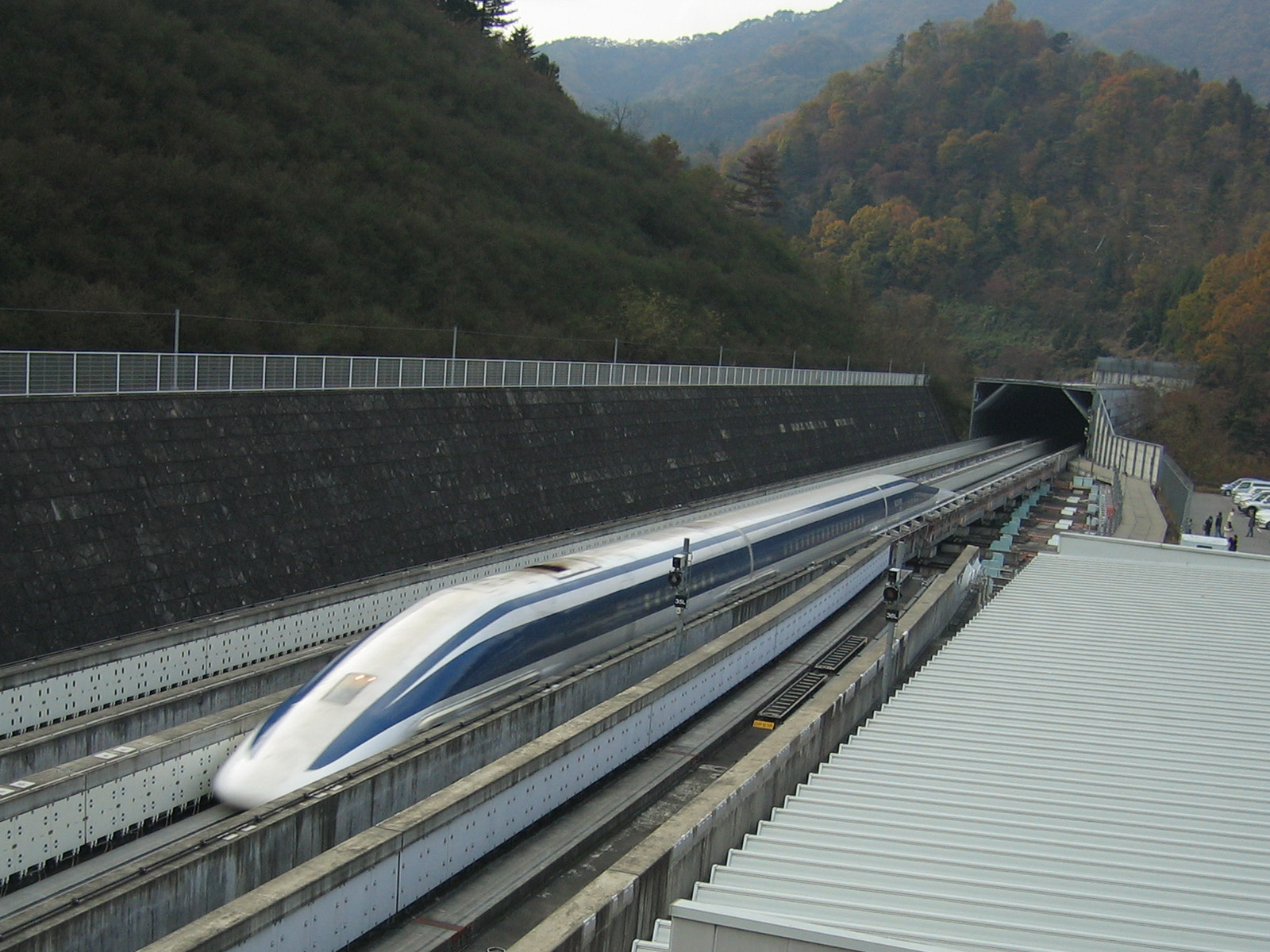
SCMaglev on the Yamanashi test track in Japan in November 2005

Electromagnetic propulsion is utilized in transportation systems to minimize friction and maximize speed over long distances. This has mainly been implemented in high-speed rail systems that use a linear induction motor to power trains by magnetic currents. It has also been utilized in theme parks to create high-speed roller coasters and water rides.

Maglev

In a maglev train the primary coil assembly lies below the reaction plate. There is a 1–10 cm (0.39-3.93 inch) air gap between that eliminates friction, allowing for speeds up to 500 km/h (310 mph). An alternating electric current is supplied to the coils, which creates a change in polarity of the magnetic field. This pulls the train forward from the front, and thrusts the train forward from the back.

A typical Maglev train costs three cents per passenger mile, or seven cents per ton mile (not including construction costs). This compares to 15 cents per passenger miles for travel by plane and 30 cents for ton mile for travel by intercity trucks. Maglev tracks have high longevity due to minimal friction and an even distribution of weight. Most last for at least 50 years and require little maintenance during this time. Maglev trains are promoted for their energy efficiency since they run on electricity, which can be produced by coal, nuclear, hydro, fusion, wind or solar power without requiring oil. On average most trains travel 483 km/h (300 mph) and use 0.4 megajoules per passenger mile. Using a 20 mi/gallon car with 1.8 people as a comparison, travel by car is typically 97 km/h (60 mph) and uses 4 megajoules per passenger mile. The carbon dioxide emissions are based upon the method of electrical production and fuel use. Many renewable electrical production methods generate little or no carbon dioxide during production (although carbon dioxide may be released during manufacture of the components, e.g. the steel used in wind turbines). The running of the train is significantly quieter than other trains, trucks or airplanes.

Assembly: Linear Induction Motor

A linear induction motor consists of two parts: the primary coil assembly and the reaction plate. The primary coil assembly consists of phase windings surrounded by steel laminations, and includes a thermal sensor within a thermal epoxy. The reaction plate consists of a 3.2 mm (0.125 inch) thick aluminum or copper plate bonded to a 6.4 mm (0.25 inch) thick cold rolled steel sheet. There is an air gap between these two parts that creates the frictionless property an electromagnetic propulsion system encompasses. Functioning of a linear induction motor begins with an AC force that is supplied to the coil windings within the primary coil assembly. This creates a traveling magnetic field that induces a current in the reaction plate, which then creates its own magnetic field. The magnetic fields in the primary coil assembly and reaction plate alternate, which generates force and direct linear motion.

=== Spacecraft ===
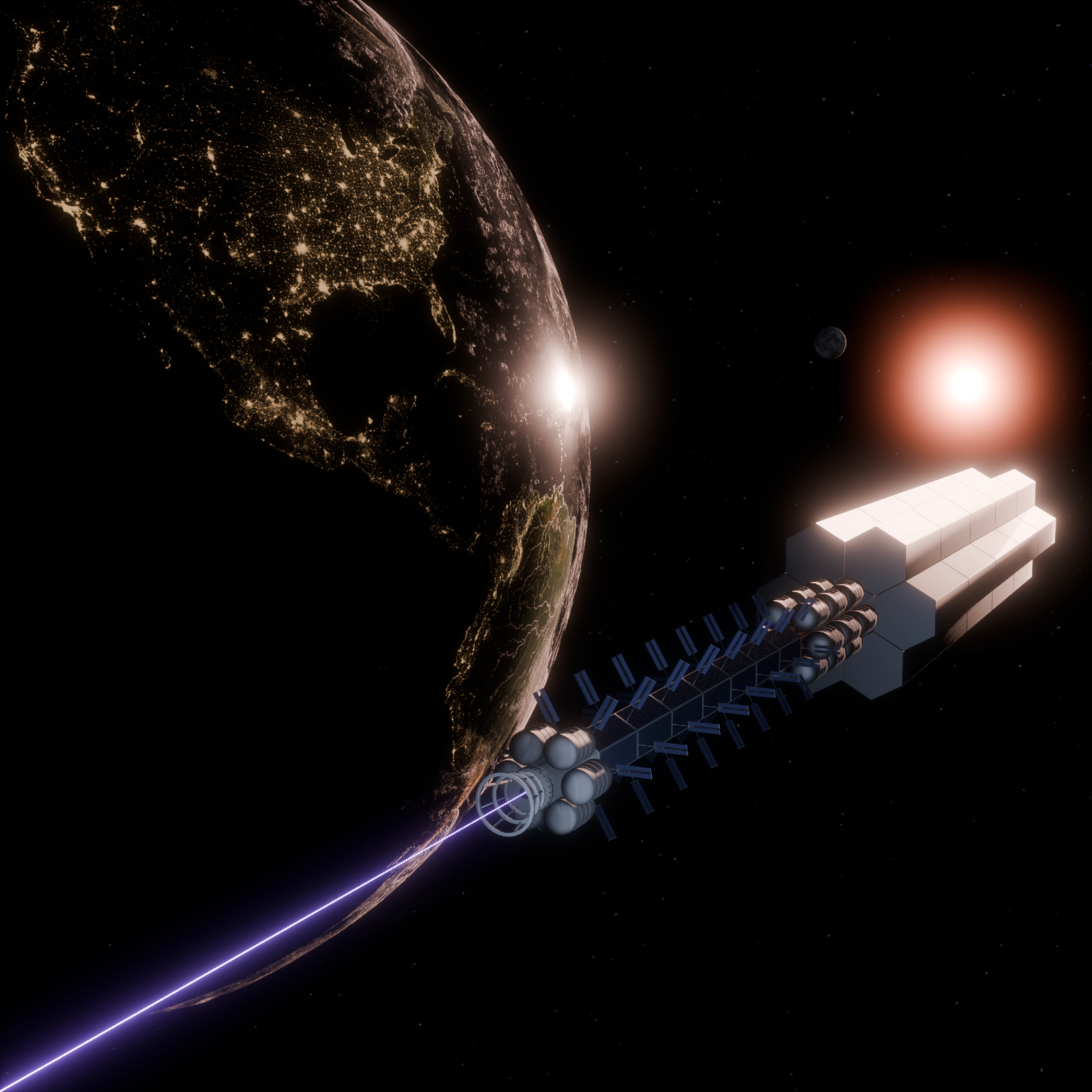
Conceptual design of an electromagnetic spacecraft

There are multiple applications for EMP technologies in the field of aerospace. Many of these applications are conceptual as of now, however, there are also several applications that range from near term to next century. One of such applications is the use of EMP to control fine adjustments of orbiting satellites. One of these particular systems is based on the direct interactions of the vehicle's own electromagnetic field and the magnetic field of the Earth. The thrust force may be thought of as an electrodynamic force of interaction of the electric current inside its conductors with the applied natural field of the Earth. To attain a greater force of interaction, the magnetic field must be propagated further from the flight craft. The advantages of such systems is the very precise and instantaneous control over the thrust force. In addition, the expected electrical efficiencies are far greater than those of current chemical rockets that attain propulsion through the intermediate use of heat; this results in low efficiencies and large amounts of gaseous pollutants. The electrical energy in the coil of the EMP system is translated to potential and kinetic energy through direct energy conversion. This results in the system having the same high efficiencies as other electrical machines while excluding the ejection of any substance into the environment.

The current thrust-to mass ratios of these systems are relatively low. Nevertheless, since they do not require reaction mass, the vehicle mass is constant. Also, the thrust can be continuous with relatively low electric consumption. The biggest limitation would be mainly the electrical conductance of materials to produce the necessary values of the current in the propulsion system.

=== Ships and Submarines ===
EMP and its applications for seagoing ships and submarines have been investigated since at least 1958 when Warren Rice filed a patent describing the technology. The technology described by Rice considered charging the hull of the vessel itself. The design was later refined by allowing the water to flow through thrusters as described in a later patent by James Meng. The arrangement consists of a water channel open at both ends extending longitudinally through or attached to the ship, a means for producing magnetic field throughout the water channel, electrodes at each side of the channel and source of power to send direct current through the channel at right angles to magnetic flux in accordance with Lorentz force.

=== Elevators ===
Cable-free elevators using EMP, capable of moving both vertically and horizontally, have been developed by German engineering firm Thyssen Krupp for use in skyscrapers.

== See also ==
- Coilgun
- Magnetohydrodynamics
- Railgun
