= Working mass =

Mass against which a system operates

Working mass, also referred to as reaction mass, is a mass against which a system operates in order to produce acceleration. In the case of a chemical rocket, for example, the reaction mass is the product of the burned fuel shot backwards to provide propulsion. All acceleration requires an exchange of momentum, which can be thought of as the "unit of movement". Momentum is related to mass and velocity, as given by the formula P = mv, where P is the momentum, m the mass, and v the velocity. The velocity of a body is easily changeable, but in most cases the mass is not, which makes it important. The working mass of a fuel can be determined by mathematical calculation.

== Rockets and rocket-like reaction engines ==
In rockets, the total velocity change can be calculated (using the Tsiolkovsky rocket equation) as follows:

$\Delta\,v = u\,\ln\left(\frac{m + M}{M}\right)$

Where:

- v = ship velocity.
- u = exhaust velocity.
- M = ship mass, not including the working mass.
- m = total mass ejected from the ship (working mass).

The terms working mass or reaction mass are used primarily in the aerospace, aeronautics and astronautics fields. In more "down to earth" examples, the working mass is typically provided by the Earth, which contains so much momentum in comparison to most vehicles that the amount it gains or loses can be ignored. However, in the case of an aircraft the working mass is the air, and in the case of a rocket, it is the rocket fuel itself. Most rocket engines use light-weight fuels (liquid hydrogen, oxygen, or kerosene) accelerated to supersonic speeds. However, ion engines often use heavier elements like xenon as the reaction mass, accelerated to much higher speeds using electric fields.

In many cases, the working mass is separate from the energy used to accelerate it. In a car, the engine provides power to the wheels, which then accelerates the Earth backward to make the car move forward. This is not the case for most rockets, however, where the rocket propellant is the working mass, as well as the energy source. This means that rockets stop accelerating as soon as they run out of fuel, regardless of other power sources they may have. This can be a problem for satellites that need to be repositioned often, as it limits their useful life. In general, the exhaust velocity should be close to the ship velocity for optimum energy efficiency.

== See also ==
- Rocket equation
