= Propellant =

Chemical substance used for propulsion

A propellant (or propellent) is a mass that is expelled or expanded in such a way as to create a thrust or another motive force in accordance with Newton's third law of motion, and "propel" a vehicle, projectile, or fluid payload. In vehicles, the engine that expels the propellant is called a reaction engine. Although technically a propellant is the reaction mass used to create thrust, the term "propellant" is often used to describe a substance which contains both the reaction mass and the fuel that holds the energy used to accelerate the reaction mass. For example, the term "propellant" is often used in chemical rocket design to describe a combined fuel/propellant, although the propellants should not be confused with the fuel that is used by an engine to produce the energy that expels the propellant. Even though the byproducts of substances used as fuel are also often used as a reaction mass to create the thrust, such as with a chemical rocket engine, propellant and fuel are two distinct concepts.

Vehicles can use propellants to move by ejecting a propellant backwards which creates an opposite force that moves the vehicle forward. Projectiles can use propellants that are expanding gases which provide the motive force to set the projectile in motion. Aerosol cans use propellants which are fluids that are compressed so that when the propellant is allowed to escape by releasing a valve, the energy stored by the compression moves the propellant out of the can and that propellant forces the aerosol payload out along with the propellant. Compressed fluid may also be used as a simple vehicle propellant, with the potential energy that is stored in the compressed fluid used to expel the fluid as the propellant. The energy stored in the fluid was added to the system when the fluid was compressed, such as compressed air. The energy applied to the pump or thermal system that is used to compress the air is stored until it is released by allowing the propellant to escape. Compressed fluid may also be used only as energy storage along with some other substance as the propellant, such as with a water rocket, where the energy stored in the compressed air is the fuel and the water is the propellant.

In electrically powered spacecraft, electricity is used to accelerate the propellant. An electrostatic force may be used to expel positive ions, or the Lorentz force may be used to expel negative ions and electrons as the propellant. Electrothermal engines use the electromagnetic force to heat low molecular weight gases (e.g. hydrogen, helium, ammonia) into a plasma and expel the plasma as propellant. In the case of a resistojet rocket engine, the compressed propellant is simply heated using resistive heating as it is expelled to create more thrust.

In chemical rockets and aircraft, fuels are used to produce an energetic gas that can be directed through a nozzle, thereby producing thrust. In rockets, the burning of rocket fuel produces an exhaust, and the exhausted material is usually expelled as a propellant under pressure through a nozzle. The exhaust material may be a gas, liquid, plasma, or a solid. In powered aircraft without propellers such as jets, the propellant is usually the product of the burning of fuel with atmospheric oxygen so that the resulting propellant product has more mass than the fuel carried on the vehicle.

Proposed photon rockets would use the relativistic momentum of photons to create thrust. Even though photons do not have mass, they can still act as a propellant because they move at relativistic speed, i.e., the speed of light. In this case Newton's third Law of Motion is inadequate to model the physics involved and relativistic physics must be used.

In chemical rockets, chemical reactions are used to produce energy which creates movement of a fluid which is used to expel the products of that chemical reaction (and sometimes other substances) as propellants. For example, in a simple hydrogen/oxygen engine, hydrogen is burned (oxidized) to create H_{2}O and the energy from the chemical reaction is used to expel the water (steam) to provide thrust. Often in chemical rocket engines, a higher molecular mass substance is included in the fuel to provide more reaction mass.

Rocket propellant may be expelled through an expansion nozzle as a cold gas, that is, without energetic mixing and combustion, to provide small changes in velocity to spacecraft by the use of cold gas thrusters, usually as maneuvering thrusters.

To attain a useful density for storage, most propellants are stored as either a solid or a liquid.

== Vehicle propellants ==
A rocket propellant is a mass that is expelled from a vehicle, such as a rocket, in such a way as to create a thrust in accordance with Newton's third law of motion, and "propel" the vehicle forward. The engine that expels the propellant is called a reaction engine. Although the term "propellant" is often used in chemical rocket design to describe a combined fuel/propellant, propellants should not be confused with the fuel that is used by an engine to produce the energy that expels the propellant. Even though the byproducts of substances used as fuel are also often used as a reaction mass to create the thrust, such as with a chemical rocket engine, propellant and fuel are two distinct concepts.

In electrically powered spacecraft, electricity is used to accelerate the propellant. An electrostatic force may be used to expel positive ions, or the Lorentz force may be used to expel negative ions and electrons as the propellant. Electrothermal engines use the electromagnetic force to heat low molecular weight gases (e.g. hydrogen, helium, ammonia) into a plasma and expel the plasma as propellant. In the case of a resistojet rocket engine, the compressed propellant is simply heated using resistive heating as it is expelled to create more thrust.

In chemical rockets and aircraft, fuels are used to produce an energetic gas that can be directed through a nozzle, thereby producing thrust. In rockets, the burning of rocket fuel produces an exhaust, and the exhausted material is usually expelled as a propellant under pressure through a nozzle. The exhaust material may be a gas, liquid, plasma, or a solid. In powered aircraft without propellers such as jets, the propellant is usually the product of the burning of fuel with atmospheric oxygen so that the resulting propellant product has more mass than the fuel carried on the vehicle.

The propellant or fuel may also simply be a compressed fluid, with the potential energy that is stored in the compressed fluid used to expel the fluid as the propellant. The energy stored in the fluid was added to the system when the fluid was compressed, such as compressed air. The energy applied to the pump or thermal system that is used to compress the air is stored until it is released by allowing the propellant to escape. Compressed fluid may also be used only as energy storage along with some other substance as the propellant, such as with a water rocket, where the energy stored in the compressed air is the fuel and the water is the propellant.

Proposed photon rockets would use the relativistic momentum of photons to create thrust. Even though photons do not have mass, they can still act as a propellant because they move at relativistic speed, i.e., the speed of light. In this case Newton's third Law of Motion is inadequate to model the physics involved and relativistic physics must be used.

In chemical rockets, chemical reactions are used to produce energy which creates movement of a fluid which is used to expel the products of that chemical reaction (and sometimes other substances) as propellants. For example, in a simple hydrogen/oxygen engine, hydrogen is burned (oxidized) to create H_{2}O and the energy from the chemical reaction is used to expel the water (steam) to provide thrust. Often in chemical rocket engines, a higher molecular mass substance is included in the fuel to provide more reaction mass.

Rocket propellant may be expelled through an expansion nozzle as a cold gas, that is, without energetic mixing and combustion, to provide small changes in velocity to spacecraft by the use of cold gas thrusters, usually as maneuvering thrusters.

To attain a useful density for storage, most propellants are stored as either a solid or a liquid.

Propellants may be energized by chemical reactions to expel solid, liquid or gas. Electrical energy may be used to expel gases, plasmas, ions, solids or liquids. Photons may be used to provide thrust via relativistic momentum.

=== Chemically powered ===
==== Solid propellant ====
- Composite propellants made from a solid oxidizer such as ammonium perchlorate or ammonium nitrate, a synthetic rubber such as HTPB, PBAN, or Polyurethane (or energetic polymers such as polyglycidyl nitrate or polyvinyl nitrate for extra energy), optional high-explosive fuels (again, for extra energy) such as RDX or nitroglycerin, and usually a powdered metal fuel such as aluminum.
- Some amateur propellants use potassium nitrate, combined with sugar, epoxy, or other fuels and binder compounds.
- Potassium perchlorate has been used as an oxidizer, paired with asphalt, epoxy, and other binders.

Propellants that explode in operation are of little practical use currently, although there have been experiments with Pulse Detonation Engines. Also the newly synthesized bishomocubane based compounds are under consideration in the research stage as both solid and liquid propellants of the future.

===== Grain =====
Solid fuel/propellants are used in forms called grains. A grain is any individual particle of fuel/propellant regardless of the size or shape. The shape and size of a grain determines the burn time, amount of gas, and rate of produced energy from the burning of the fuel and, as a consequence, thrust vs time profile.

There are three types of burns that can be achieved with different grains.

Progressive burn
Usually a grain with multiple perforations or a star cut in the center providing a lot of surface area.
Degressive burn
Usually a solid grain in the shape of a cylinder or sphere.
Neutral burn
Usually a single perforation; as outside surface decreases the inside surface increases at the same rate.

===== Composition =====
There are four different types of solid fuel/propellant compositions:

Single-based fuel/propellant
A single based fuel/propellant has nitrocellulose as its chief explosives ingredient. Stabilizers and other additives are used to control the chemical stability and enhance its properties.
Double-based fuel/propellant
Double-based fuel/propellants consist of nitrocellulose with nitroglycerin or other liquid organic nitrate explosives added. Stabilizers and other additives are also used. Nitroglycerin reduces smoke and increases the energy output. Double-based fuel/propellants are used in small arms, cannons, mortars and rockets.
Triple-based fuel/propellant
Triple-based fuel/propellants consist of nitrocellulose, nitroguanidine, nitroglycerin or other liquid organic nitrate explosives. Triple-based fuel/propellants are used in cannons.
Composite
Composites do not utilize nitrocellulose, nitroglycerin, nitroguanidine or any other organic nitrate as the primary constituent. Composites usually consist of a fuel such as metallic aluminum, a combustible binder such as synthetic rubber or HTPB, and an oxidizer such as ammonium perchlorate. Composite fuel/propellants are used in large rocket motors. In some applications, such as the US SLBM Trident II missile, nitroglycerin is added to the aluminum and ammonium perchlorate composite as an energetic plasticizer.

==== Liquid propellant ====
In rockets, three main liquid bipropellant combinations are used: cryogenic oxygen and hydrogen, cryogenic oxygen and a hydrocarbon, and storable propellants.

Cryogenic oxygen-hydrogen combination system
Used in upper stages and sometimes in booster stages of space launch systems. This is a nontoxic combination. This gives high specific impulse and is ideal for high-velocity missions.
Cryogenic oxygen-hydrocarbon propellant system
Used for many booster stages of space launch vehicles as well as a smaller number of second stages. This combination of fuel/oxidizer has high density and hence allows for a more compact booster design.
Storable propellant combinations
Used in almost all bipropellant low-thrust, auxiliary or reaction control rocket engines, as well as in some in large rocket engines for first and second stages of ballistic missiles. They are instant-starting and suitable for long-term storage.

Propellant combinations used for liquid propellant rockets include:

- Liquid oxygen and liquid hydrogen
- Liquid oxygen and kerosene or RP-1
- Liquid oxygen and ethanol
- Liquid oxygen and methane
- Hydrogen peroxide and mentioned above alcohol or RP-1
- Red fuming nitric acid (RFNA) and kerosene or RP-1
- RFNA and Unsymmetrical dimethylhydrazine (UDMH)
- Dinitrogen tetroxide and UDMH, MMH, and/or hydrazine

Common monopropellant used for liquid rocket engines include:

- Hydrogen peroxide
- Hydrazine
- Red fuming nitric acid (RFNA)

=== Electrically powered ===
Electrically powered reactive engines use a variety of usually ionized propellants, including atomic ions, plasma, electrons, or small droplets or solid particles as propellant.

==== Electrostatic ====
If the acceleration is caused mainly by the Coulomb force (i.e. application of a static electric field in the direction of the acceleration) the device is considered electrostatic. The types of electrostatic drives and their propellants:

- Gridded ion thruster – using positive ions as the propellant, accelerated by an electrically charged grid
  - NASA Solar Technology Application Readiness (NSTAR) – positive ions accelerated using high-voltage electrodes
  - HiPEP – using positive ions as the propellant, created using microwaves
  - Radiofrequency ion thruster – generalization of HiPEP
- Hall-effect thruster, including its subtypes Stationary Plasma Thruster (SPT) and Thruster with Anode Layer (TAL) – use the Hall effect to orient electrons to create positive ions for propellant
- Colloid ion thruster – electrostatic acceleration of droplets of liquid salt as the propellant
- Field-emission electric propulsion – using electrodes to accelerate ionized liquid metal as a propellant
- Nano-particle field extraction thruster – using charged cylindrical carbon nanotubes as propellant

==== Electrothermal ====
These are engines that use electromagnetic fields to generate a plasma which is used as the propellant. They use a nozzle to direct the energized propellant. The nozzle itself may be composed simply of a magnetic field. Low molecular weight gases (e.g. hydrogen, helium, ammonia) are preferred propellants for this kind of system.

- Resistojet – using a usually inert compressed propellant that is energized by simple resistive heating
- Arcjet – uses (usually) hydrazine or ammonia as a propellant which is energized with an electrical arc
- Microwave – a type of Radiofrequency ion thruster
- Variable specific impulse magnetoplasma rocket (VASIMR) – using microwave-generated plasma as the propellant and magnetic field to direct its expulsion

==== Electromagnetic ====
Electromagnetic thrusters use ions as the propellant, which are accelerated by the Lorentz force or by magnetic fields, either of which is generated by electricity:

- Electrodeless plasma thruster – a complex system that uses cold plasma as a propellant that is accelerated by ponderomotive force
- Magnetoplasmadynamic thruster – propellants include xenon, neon, argon, hydrogen, hydrazine, or lithium; expelled using the Lorentz force
- Pulsed inductive thruster – because this reactive engine uses a radial magnetic field, it acts on both positive and negative particles and so it may use a wide range of gases as a propellant including water, hydrazine, ammonia, argon, xenon and many others
- Pulsed plasma thruster – uses a Teflon plasma as a propellant, which is created by an electrical arc and expelled using the Lorentz force
- Helicon Double Layer Thruster – a plasma propellant is generated and excited from a gas using a helicon induced by high frequency band radiowaves which form a magnetic nozzle in a cylinder

=== Nuclear ===
Nuclear reactions may be used to produce the energy for the expulsion of the propellants. Many types of nuclear reactors have been used/proposed to produce electricity for electrical propulsion as outlined above. Nuclear pulse propulsion uses a series of nuclear explosions to create large amounts of energy to expel the products of the nuclear reaction as the propellant. Nuclear thermal rockets use the heat of a nuclear reaction to heat a propellant. Usually the propellant is hydrogen because the force is a function of the energy irrespective of the mass of the propellant, so the lightest propellant (hydrogen) produces the greatest specific impulse.

=== Photonic ===
A photonic reactive engine uses photons as the propellant and their discrete relativistic energy to produce thrust.

== Projectile propellants ==
Projectile propellants are chemical or physical materials that burn or expand rapidly to produce high-pressure gas, forcing a projectile out of a barrel or propulsion system.

=== Types ===
==== Black powder ====
This is an early low explosive made of potassium nitrate, charcoal, and sulfur, used in antique firearms and specialized effects.

==== Smokeless powder ====
This is the standard propellant for modern firearms, artillery, and small arms, consisting of nitrocellulose, nitroglycerin, and nitroguanidine.

==== Solid rocket propellants ====
These are either monopropellants or bipropellants tested in advanced or specialized artillery and rocket systems.

==== Pneumatic systems ====
These are non-combustible compressed gases used in specialized light-gas guns.

== Compressed fluid propellants ==
Compressed fluid or compressed gas propellants are pressurized physically, by a compressor, rather than by a chemical reaction. The pressures and energy densities that can be achieved, while insufficient for high-performance rocketry and firearms, are adequate for most applications, in which case compressed fluids offer a simpler, safer, and more practical source of propellant pressure.

A compressed fluid propellant may simply be a pressurized gas, or a substance which is a gas at atmospheric pressure, but stored under pressure as a liquid.

=== Compressed gas propellants ===
In applications in which a large quantity of propellant is used, such as pressure washing and airbrushing, air may be pressurized by a compressor and used immediately. Additionally, a hand pump to compress air can be used for its simplicity in low-tech applications such as atomizers, plant misters and water rockets. The simplest examples of such a system are squeeze bottles for such liquids as ketchup and shampoo.

However, compressed gases are impractical as stored propellants if they do not liquify inside the storage container, because very high pressures are required in order to store any significant quantity of gas, and high-pressure gas cylinders and pressure regulators are expensive and heavy.

=== Liquified gas propellants ===
==== Principle ====
Liquefied gas propellants are gases at atmospheric pressure, but become liquid at a modest pressure. This pressure is high enough to provide useful propulsion of the payload (e.g. aerosol paint, deodorant, lubricant), but is low enough to be stored in an inexpensive metal can, and to not pose a safety hazard in case the can is ruptured.

The mixture of liquid and gaseous propellant inside the can maintains a constant pressure, called the liquid's vapor pressure. As the payload is depleted, the propellant vaporizes to fill the internal volume of the can. Liquids are typically 500-1000x denser than their corresponding gases at atmospheric pressure; even at the higher pressure inside the can, only a small fraction of its volume needs to be propellant in order to eject the payload and replace it with vapor.

Vaporizing the liquid propellant to gas requires some energy, the enthalpy of vaporization, which cools the system. This is usually insignificant, although it can sometimes be an unwanted effect of heavy usage (as the system cools, the vapor pressure of the propellant drops). However, in the case of a freeze spray, this cooling contributes to the desired effect (although freeze sprays may also contain other components, such as chloroethane, with a lower vapor pressure but higher enthalpy of vaporization than the propellant).

==== Propellant compounds ====
Chlorofluorocarbons (CFCs) were once often used as propellants, but since the Montreal Protocol came into force in 1989, they have been replaced in nearly every country due to the negative effects CFCs have on Earth's ozone layer. The most common replacements of CFCs are mixtures of volatile hydrocarbons, typically propane, n-butane and isobutane. Dimethyl ether (DME) and methyl ethyl ether are also used. All these have the disadvantage of being flammable. Nitrous oxide and carbon dioxide are also used as propellants to deliver foodstuffs (for example, whipped cream and cooking spray). Medicinal aerosols such as asthma inhalers use hydrofluoroalkanes (HFA): either HFA 134a (1,1,1,2,-tetrafluoroethane) or HFA 227 (1,1,1,2,3,3,3-heptafluoropropane) or combinations of the two. More recently, liquid hydrofluoroolefin (HFO) propellants have become more widely adopted in aerosol systems due to their relatively low vapor pressure, low global warming potential (GWP), and nonflammability.

==== Payloads ====
The practicality of liquified gas propellants allows for a broad variety of payloads. Aerosol sprays, in which a liquid is ejected as a spray, include paints, lubricants, degreasers, and protective coatings; deodorants and other personal care products; cooking oils. Some liquid payloads are not sprayed due to lower propellant pressure and/or viscous payload, as with whipped cream and shaving cream or shaving gel. Low-power guns, such as BB guns, paintball guns, and airsoft guns, have solid projectile payloads. Uniquely, in the case of a gas duster ("canned air"), the only payload is the velocity of the propellant vapor itself.

== See also ==
- Cartridge (firearms)
- Explosive material
- Fuel
- Propellant depot
- Spacecraft propulsion
- Specific impulse
- Tubes and primers for ammunition

== Bibliography ==
- Clark, John D. (1972). Ignition! An Informal History of Liquid Rocket Propellants. Rutgers University Press. ISBN 0-8135-0725-1.
