= CU Aerospace =

American aerospace company

CU Aerospace, LLC (also known as Champaign Urbana Aerospace, or CUA for short) is an American private aerospace company headquartered in Champaign, Illinois. Founded in 1998, the company develops propulsion systems, aerospace technologies, and engineering software primarily for small spacecraft and government research programs.

== Overview ==
CU Aerospace
- Type: Private
- Industry: Aerospace
- Founded: 1998, 28 years
- Founder: Wayne Solomon, David Carroll, Rodney Burton, Victoria Coverstone, Michael Bragg, and Scott White
- Headquarters: Champaign, Illinois, United States
- Members: 10 owner members
- Number of employees: 20 employees
- Website: www.cuaerospace.com

CU Aerospace specializes in the research, development, and commercialization of aerospace technologies, with a focus on small satellite propulsion systems, electric propulsion, simulation software, and advanced materials. Its customers have included United States government agencies and commercial aerospace organizations, including NASA, the U.S. Air Force, the U.S. Space Force, and the Defense Advanced Research Projects Agency (DARPA).

As of 2025, the company employed approximately 20 people.

== History ==
CU Aerospace was founded in 1998 by aerospace engineers Wayne Solomon, David Carroll, Rodney Burton, Victoria Coverstone, Michael Bragg, and Scott White, who were affiliated with the University of Illinois Urbana-Champaign. The company was originally established as a research-focused organization conducting aerospace concept development and exploratory technology programs.

During its early years, the company conducted research in areas including chemical laser technologies. Over time, CU Aerospace transitioned toward developing spacecraft propulsion systems and flight-ready hardware, with an emphasis on small spacecraft and alternative propellant technologies. The company later expanded its work into electric propulsion and space systems engineering.

== Academic and research partnerships ==
CU Aerospace has a long-standing collaboration with the University of Illinois at Urbana–Champaign. The company has employed more than 100 student interns over its history, many of whom later became full-time employees. Several company founders and current staff members hold degrees from the university.

== Spaceflight and propulsion systems ==
=== Small satellite propulsion ===
CU Aerospace has developed multiple propulsion systems intended for CubeSat- and small-satellite-class spacecraft. These systems include warm-gas, pulsed-plasma, resistojets, and monopropellant thrusters, designed for orbit maintenance, maneuvering, and deorbiting missions.

=== Electric and plasma propulsion ===
The company has conducted research and development in electric propulsion, including pulsed plasma thrusters and magnetoplasmadynamic (MPD) thrusters. In 2025, CU Aerospace received a U.S. patent related to a magnetoplasmadynamic thruster design featuring reverse polarity and tailored mass flux.

== Notable programs and missions ==
=== Electric Oxygen-Iodine Laser (ElectricOIL) ===
Between 2007 and 2011, CU Aerospace engineers developed and experimentally demonstrated an electrically powered variant of the chemical oxygen–iodine laser. The system replaced chemical energy sources with electrical power, with the aim of improving mass scalability and operational safety. Research publications describing the system appeared in peer-reviewed scientific journals.

=== NASA DUPLEX Mission ===
In 2019, CU Aerospace was selected as an awardee under NASA’s Tipping Point program for the Dual Propulsion Experiment (DUPLEX). Two propulsion systems developed by the company (MVP: Monofilament Vaporization Propulsion Thruster System and FPPT: Fiber-Fed Pulsed Plasma Thruster) were launched aboard a Northrop Grumman Cygnus spacecraft in September 2025 and deployed from the International Space Station in December 2025. (The video shows the DUPLEX satellite being launched into orbit.) The systems are undergoing in‑space testing for technical readiness assessment.

=== Active debris removal research ===
In 2023, CU Aerospace was awarded a NASA Small Business Innovation Research (SBIR) Phase II contract to develop propulsion technology for active orbital debris removal missions using a fiber-fed pulsed plasma thruster system. Their FPPT Thruster, scaled to an ESPA Class space vehicle, will be utilized to allow a debris capture mission to make multiple trips.

== Government research programs ==
CU Aerospace has participated in multiple U.S. government research programs. The company received a DARPA contract to develop an air breathing pulsed magnetoplasmadynamic thruster (MPD) intended for very low Earth orbit (VLEO) missions. The effort focused on propulsion concepts that utilize atmospheric gases as propellant. CUA received a U.S. Patent for their MPD technology in May 2025 entitled, “Magnetoplasmadynamic Thruster With Reverse Polarity And Tailored Mass Flux.” Patent #12309909.

The company is also a member of the Space Power and Propulsion for Agility, Responsiveness and Resilience (SPAR) Institute, a United States Space Force (USSF)–funded research consortium formed in 2024 involving universities and industry partners focused on advancing electric propulsion technologies.

== Patents and awards ==
As of 2025, CU Aerospace has received more than 50 Phase I and 25 Phase II Small Business Innovation Research (SBIR) or Small Business Technology Transfer (STTR) awards from U.S. government agencies. The company holds multiple U.S. and international patents related to propulsion systems and aerospace technologies.

== Software and engineering services ==
In addition to hardware development, CU Aerospace provides aerospace engineering services, propulsion testing, and mission analysis. The company has developed software tools for spacecraft trajectory optimization (DYLAN) and thermal‑fluid system simulation (THERMOSYS).

== See also ==
- Small satellite propulsion
- Electric Propulsion
- CubeSat
