= Microwave electrothermal thruster =

Type of space propulsion using microwaves

Microwave electrothermal thruster, also known as MET, is a propulsion device that converts microwave energy (a type of electromagnetic radiation) into thermal (or heat) energy. These thrusters are predominantly used in spacecraft propulsion, more specifically to adjust the spacecraft’s position and orbit. A MET sustains and ignites a plasma in a propellant gas. This creates a heated propellant gas which in turn changes into thrust due to the expansion of the gas going through the nozzle. A MET’s heating feature is like one of an arc-jet (another propulsion device); however, due to the free-floating plasma, there are no problems with the erosion of metal electrodes, and therefore the MET is more efficient.

== Mechanism description ==
The MET contains key features and parts that contribute to its efficiency. The parts include: two endplates (nozzle and antenna), plasma, and a dielectric separation plate.

The resonant cavity is the round overlapping section waveguide that is shorted by the two endplates. The cavity is near the separation plate. There are two end plates inside the MET: the nozzle and the antenna. The nozzle’s function is to convert the gaseous plasma into thrust. The antenna is used to input the microwave power. Although most of the power is absorbed by the plasma, some of it is reflected. Another part of the MET is the plasma. In some cases, plasma is also referred to as the fourth state of matter. The plasma is the main portion of the MET. It is created inside of the system by heating the propellant and is exhausted to generate thrust. The last part of the MET is the dielectric separation plate. This piece of the MET allows both parts of the cavity to be controlled at various pressures.

== Principle of operation ==
=== Description ===
In order for the MET to create thrust, it must go through a 4 step process of converting electrical energy into heat energy.

1. The propellant gas is first injected tangentially into the MET through the nozzle, which allows the plasma to form.
2. By doing so tangentially, there will be a vortex flow (circular flow) in the system, which creates a cool environment for the plasma to be stabilized.
3. In order for the plasma to ignite at low levels of electromagnetic power to create thrust, it must be at a low pressure; however, if the plasma has already been ignited, it will be able to survive in the high pressures.
4. The free-flowing plasma is heated and released through the nozzle, thereby creating thrust.

During this process, the antenna section is held at atmospheric pressure to ensure that there is no plasma formation close to the antenna. It also ensures that the separation plates are not held at two significantly different pressures, which would put stress upon the two plates.

The physical process for what takes place on a molecular level can also be explained in the following manner:

1. The microwave electrical field causes the electrons to speed up, which then causes them to have collisions with the molecules and atoms inside the plasma.
2. Through the collisions, there is a transfer of energy to the atoms and molecules in the plasma.
3. The energy is then converted into heat energy by having inelastic collisions.

=== Mathematically ===
==== Thrust ====
Thrust is the force that is applied on the rocket caused by when the propellant is released. The formula for thrust is given as:

$\tau = \dot{m}u_e + (p_e + p_a)A_e$

Where thrust is given as $\tau$ in Newtons(N), $\dot{m}$ as mass flow rate in kilograms/second(kg/s), $u_e$ as exhaust velocity in meters/second(m/s), $p_e$ as exit pressure, $p_a$ as atmospheric pressure, and $A_e$ as nozzle exit area in meters^2(m^2).

==== Specific impulse ====
Specific impulse is how efficiently the fuel of the MET is used to create thrust. The formula for specific impulse is given as:

$I_{sp} = \tau/\dot{m}g$

Where $I_{sp}$ is given as specific impulse, $\tau$ as thrust in N, $\dot{m}$ as mass flow rate in kg/s, and $g$ as the gravitational acceleration of the earth.

==== Mass relationship ====
When applying the conservation of momentum law, the relationship between mass of propellant and initial mass of the spacecraft can be shown as:

$M_p/M_i = 1-e^{-\Delta v/I_{sp}g}$

Where $M_p$ is given as propellant mass, $M_i$ as initial spacecraft mass, $\Delta v$ as change in velocity, $I_{sp}$ is as specific impulse, and $g$ as earth’s gravity.

== Application ==
=== Space ===
The MET’s main purpose is spacecraft propulsion. The energy that is created is meant to be converted into kinetic energy, which will produce thrust in space. Some tasks include orbit raising and stationkeeping. Orbit raising is changing the orbit of a ship using propulsion systems, while stationkeeping is maintaining a spacecraft’s position in relation to other spacecraft. This includes the maintenance of satellites at certain positions.

== Developments ==
=== Control system ===
In August 2020, a control system based on the MET was devised. When the MET changes the energy from electromagnetic waves to propellant, it allows for the small impulses of the MET to provide autonomous control over the satellite.

=== In-space electrothermal propulsion ===
The MET was adapted for in-space electrothermal propulsion. In order to control the altitude of a satellite/spacecraft and for primary propulsion, the tunable frequency MET was provided. Instead of a magnetron (microwave generating device), there were alternative constructional features which included using generators and semiconductors. This made it more efficient allowing the thruster to operate at two separate frequencies.

== Pros and cons ==
=== Pros ===
Relative to other electrothermal thrusters, the MET ranks higher than resistojets and some claim that they may be able to achieve similar performance to arc-jets. This is based on the supposition that the MET provides higher specific impulse, or in simpler terms more thrust for the amount of fuel. Another advantage is that because microwaves can be collected and fed directly into the thrust chamber, the MET is extremely compatible with space transport. Finally, the MET can be run on water vapor as a propellant, which is abundant throughout the cosmos.

=== Cons ===
In general, electrothermal thrusters have the lowest efficiency among most other electric propulsion systems. MET ranks lower than most electrostatic thrusters such as ion thrusters. Another disadvantage is that the MET has relatively low thrust compared to chemical rocket engines (although this is true for electric propulsion in general).
