= M Drive =

M-Drive or M-Thruster or variation may refer to:

- Magnetohydrodynamic drive, MHD drive usually used to propel watercraft
  - Magnetoplasmadynamic thruster, MPD thruster usually used to propel spacecraft

== See also ==
- Magnetodynamic force
- Magnetic Drive Pump
- Magsail
- Q-thruster
