= Vacuum arc thruster =

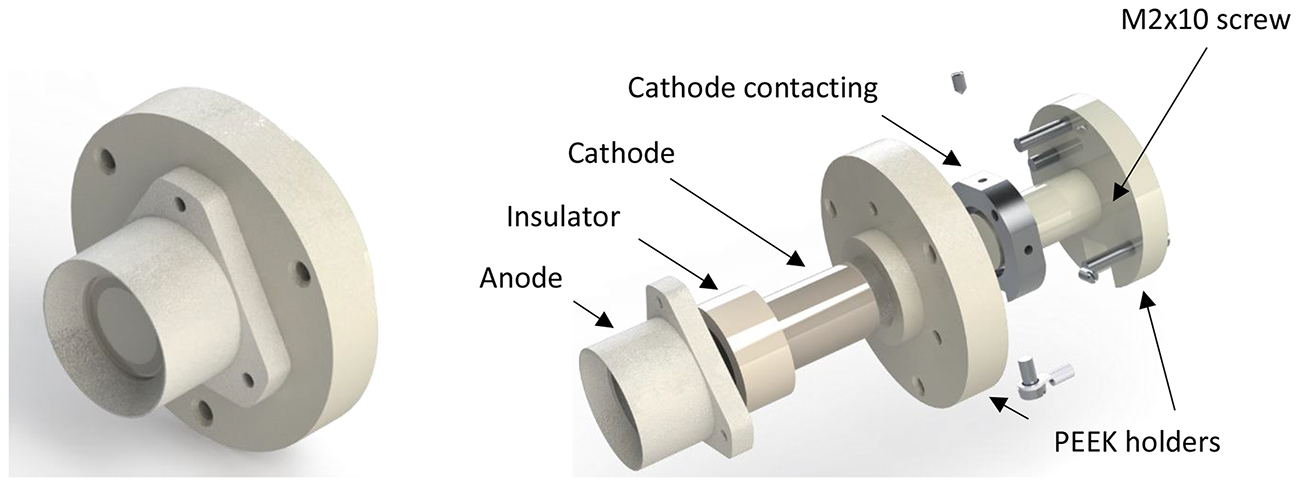
Vacuum arc thruster head and thruster head exploded view.

A vacuum arc thruster (VAT) is a form of electric spacecraft propulsion. It uses a vacuum arc discharge, across an insulator, between two electrodes to produce thrust. A metal plasma is produced from micrometer-size cathodic spots and the momentum from the plasma creates thrust for the vacuum arc thruster. Thus, whereas the insulator is used as propellant in a pulsed plasma thruster, in a VAT the solid metallic cathode is consumed as propellant. Vacuum arc thrusters are used for propulsion on CubeSats, microsatellites, and nanosatellites.

== Design and configurations ==
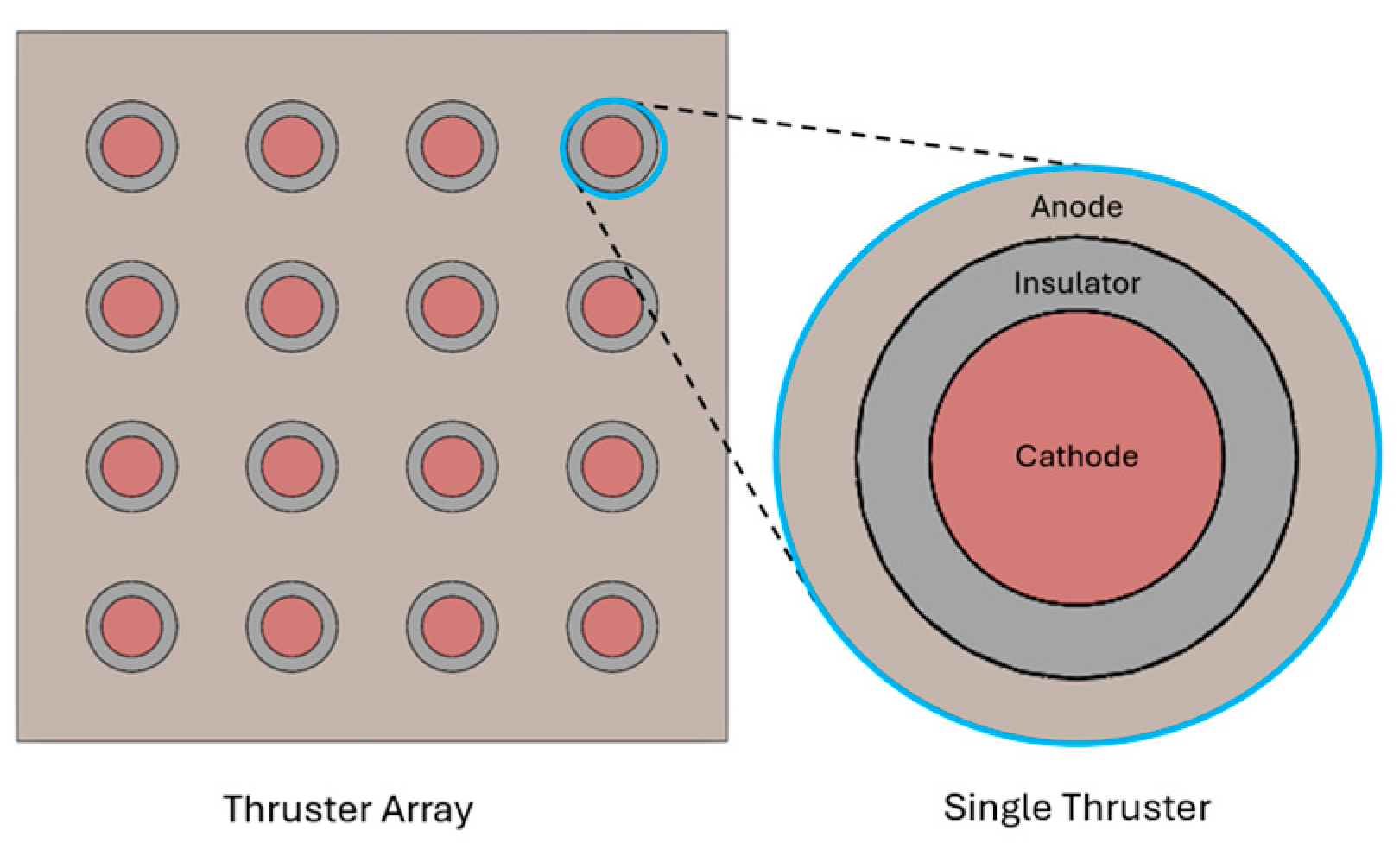
Thruster array illustration with enlarged cross-section of a single thruster.

=== Thruster arrays ===
Vacuum arc thrusters are sometimes implemented in multi-unit arrays, in which two or more devices are arranged in a grid configuration. Because individual VATs provide low impulse per pulse, VAT arrays can increase the total impulse and improve reliability. The off-axis placement of thrusters allows for rotational motion which can be used for altitude control. However, VAT arrays require a larger power processing unit and an additional control system which pose integration issues for CubeSats and other small satellites.

Some VAT array designs implement cathode architectures where multiple discharge sites are integrated into a single device rather than integrated as several thrusters. In these configurations, the central segments are the primary source of propulsion and the peripheral segments can be used for altitude control. Segmented VAT arrays can also provide fine velocity adjustments for satellite formation flying.

== Variants ==
=== High Efficient and Reliable Vacuum Arc Thruster ===
The High Efficient and Reliable Vacuum Arc Thruster (HERVAT) is a variant of the vacuum arc thruster designed to improve discharge stability and operational efficiency. Most conventional vacuum arc thrusters utilize an inductive energy storage, whereas a HERVAT employs a power processing unit which reduces electrical stress. The cathode arc propulsion generation remains unchanged from standard VAT designs.

The operational lifetime of a HERVAT under laboratory conditions is roughly 10^{7} pulses. For in-space conditions, the operational lifetime of a HERVAT is estimated to be roughly 10^{5} pulses. The system is able to produce 5 to 40 μN and thrust to power ratios can range from 1 to 2 μN/W.

=== Multi-anode Vacuum Arc Thruster ===
A multi-anode vacuum arc thruster (MA-VAT) is a variant of the vacuum arc thruster which incorporates two or more anodes rather than a single anode in a traditional VAT. The MA-VAT enhances the ion current and velocity when subject to magnetic nozzle influence, thus increasing the thrust and lifespan. For a MA-VAT, it has been found that the thrust to power ratio increases by a factor of 2.88 when compared to a conventional VAT.

== See also ==
- Pulsed plasma thruster
- Vacuum arc
