= Cavea-B =

Monopropellant

Properties
| Chemical formula | C_{10}H_{19}N_{2}, HNO_{3} |
| Molar mass | 167.276 g·mol^{−1} |
- Except where otherwise noted, data are given for materials in their standard state (at 25 °C [77 °F], 100 kPa). Infobox references

Cavea-B is a mixture of 1,4-Diaza-1,2,4-trimethyl bicyclo[2.2.2]octane dinitrate, dissolved in white fuming nitric acid. It was researched during the 1960s by teams working at the Naval Air Rocket Test Station as an alternative to the more commonly used hydrazine monopropellant for use in spacecraft's attitude control and thruster systems. It was derived from an earlier, similar formulation which came to be called Cavea-A, which showed less promise due to its excessively high melting point.

Once ignited it is highly energetic, achieving temperatures up to 5000 °F or 3000K and thus a specific impulse of around 280 seconds. Cavea-B is considerably denser, more stable and less toxic than hydrazine, and offers a much superior performance than that of other relatively safe monopropellants such as cold thrusters. A drawback, however, is that using it is somewhat more complicated: igniting Cavea-B involves mixing it with another substance, such as UDMH, with which it is hypergolic. Though once ignited the reaction is self-sustaining, it does require an additional substance to act as a starter. By comparison regular hydrazine simply commences its violent decomposition on contact with a catalyst bed or mesh of a metal such as iridium, and thus can easily be stopped and started as many times as necessary.

At the time it was considered beneficial to find a monopropellant whose decomposition was more energetic, and thus provided more thrust per unit mass, than the traditionally used hydrazine. This would mean that reaction control systems and thrusters for orbital maneuvers on spacecraft could be made lighter by requiring less reaction mass. This would permit, for the same amount of propellant, longer operation times on low Earth orbit and for spacecraft intended to work on higher orbits, that a certain payload could be carried into those higher orbits by spacecraft that are lighter and thus cheaper to launch. Ultimately, however, Cavea-B and the high energy monopropellants that were researched alongside it were not adopted by NASA or other actors in the spacecraft industry, largely due to concerns about a self-sustaining reaction continuing into the propellant tank and detonating the contents. Hydrazine continues to be the most commonly utilized monopropellant in spacecraft as of 2019.
