= Baden-Württemberg 1 =

Former proposed lunar mission spacecraft

Baden-Württemberg 1 (BW1) was a proposed lunar mission spacecraft. The mission was led by the University of Stuttgart. The basic design was for a cubical spacecraft 1 meter on a side, with a mass of about 200 kg (441 lb). It may use an pulsed plasma thruster utilizing polytetrafluoroethylene (PTFE) as propellant. As of 2013 work on trajectories had been performed.

Baden-Württemberg 1 was part of the Stuttgart Small Satellite Program initiated in 2002 that included FLYING LAPTOP, PERSEUS, CERMIT, and the aforementioned BW-1.
