= Magnetoplasmadynamic thruster =

Form of electrically powered spacecraft propulsion

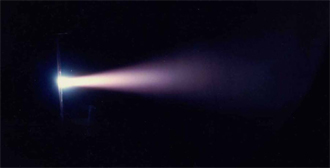
An MPD thruster during test firing

A magnetoplasmadynamic (MPD) thruster (MPDT) is a form of electrically powered spacecraft propulsion which uses the Lorentz force (the force on a charged particle by an electromagnetic field) to generate thrust. It is sometimes referred to as a Lorentz Force Accelerator (LFA) or (mostly in Japan) MPD arcjet.

Generally, a gaseous material is ionized and fed into an acceleration chamber, where the magnetic and electric fields are created using a power source. The particles are then propelled by the Lorentz force resulting from the interaction between the current flowing through the plasma and the magnetic field (which is either externally applied or induced by the current) out through the exhaust chamber. Unlike chemical propulsion, there is no combustion of fuel. As with other electric propulsion variations, both specific impulse and thrust increase with power input, while thrust per watt drops.

There are two main types of MPD thrusters, applied-field and self-field. Applied-field thrusters have magnetic rings surrounding the exhaust chamber to produce the magnetic field, while self-field thrusters have a cathode extending through the middle of the chamber. Applied fields are necessary at lower power levels, where self-field configurations are too weak. Various propellants such as xenon, neon, argon, hydrogen, hydrazine, and lithium have been used, with lithium generally being the best performer. More recently, a reverse polarity self-field MPD system was demonstrated by CU Aerospace and Princeton University's Electric Propulsion and Plasma Dynamics Lab (EPPDyL) using pure nitrogen and a 50:50 mixture of oxygen and nitrogen.

According to Edgar Choueiri magnetoplasmadynamic thrusters have input power 100–500 kilowatts, exhaust velocity 15–60 kilometers per second, thrust 2.5–25 newtons and efficiency 40–60 percent. However, additional research has shown that exhaust velocities can exceed 100 kilometers per second.

One potential application of magnetoplasmadynamic thrusters is the main propulsion engine for heavy cargo and piloted space vehicles (example engine $a^2$ for human missions to Mars).

== Advantages ==
In theory, MPD thrusters could produce extremely high specific impulses (I_{sp}) with an exhaust velocity of up to and beyond 110000 m/s, triple the value of current xenon-based ion thrusters, and about 25 times better than liquid rockets. MPD technology also has the potential for thrust levels of up to 200 newtons (N) (45 lb_{F}), by far the highest for any form of electric propulsion, and nearly as high as many interplanetary chemical rockets. This would allow use of electric propulsion on missions which require quick delta-v maneuvers (such as capturing into orbit around another planet), but with many times greater fuel efficiency.

== Development ==
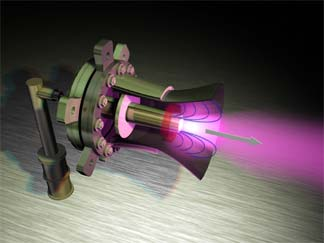
CGI rendering of Princeton University's lithium-fed self-field MPD thruster (from Popular Mechanics magazine)

MPD thruster technology has been explored academically, but commercial interest has been low due to several remaining problems. An important issue with MPD thrusters is the power requirements, which are on the order of hundreds of kilowatts required for optimum performance. Current interplanetary spacecraft power systems (such as radioisotope thermoelectric generators and solar arrays) are incapable of producing that much power. NASA's Project Prometheus reactor was expected to generate power in the hundreds of kilowatts range but was discontinued in 2005.

A project to produce a space-going nuclear reactor designed to generate 600 kilowatts of electrical power began in 1963 and ran for most of the 1960s in the USSR. It was to power a communication satellite which was in the end not approved. Nuclear reactors supplying kilowatts of electrical power (of the order of ten times more than current RTG power supplies) have been orbited by the USSR: RORSAT; and TOPAZ.

Plans to develop a megawatt-scale nuclear reactor for the use aboard a crewed spaceship were announced in 2009 by Russian nuclear Kurchatov Institute, national space agency Roskosmos, and confirmed by Russian president Dmitry Medvedev in his November 2009 address to the Federal Assembly.

Another plan, proposed by Bradley C. Edwards, is to beam power from the ground. This plan utilizes 5 200 kW free electron lasers at 0.84 micrometres with adaptive optics on the ground to beam power to the MPD-powered spacecraft, where it is converted to electricity by GaAs photovoltaic panels. The tuning of the laser wavelength of 0.840 micrometres (1.48 eV per photon) and the photovoltaic panel bandgap of 1.43 eV to each other produces an estimated conversion efficiency of 59% and a predicted power density of up to 540 kW/m^{2}. This would be sufficient to power a MPD upper stage, perhaps to lift satellites from LEO to GEO.

Another problem with MPD technology has been the degradation of cathodes due to evaporation driven by high current densities (in excess of 100 A/cm^{2}). The use of lithium and barium propellant mixtures and multi-channel hollow cathodes has been shown in the laboratory to be a promising solution for the cathode erosion problem.

In April 2026, NASA announced that its Jet Propulsion Laboratory had successfully tested a lithium‑fed magnetoplasmadynamic (MPD) thruster, achieving power levels of up to 120 kW in a vacuum chamber, a milestone for potential crewed missions to Mars.

In May 2026, CU Aerospace announced that it was developing for flight an air-breathing pulsed MPD for use in very low Earth orbit (VLEO) for DARPA’s Otter satellite program. This system is based upon its patented reverse polarity MPD technology having a central anode and outer cathode.

== Research ==
Research on MPD thrusters has been carried out in the US, the former Soviet Union, Japan, Germany, and Italy. Experimental prototypes were first flown on Soviet spacecraft and, most recently, in 1996, on the Japanese Space Flyer Unit, which demonstrated the successful operation of a quasi-steady pulsed MPD thruster in space. Research at Moscow Aviation Institute, RKK Energiya, National Aerospace University, Kharkiv Aviation Institute, Institute of Space Systems of the University of Stuttgart, ISAS, Centrospazio, Alta S.p.A., Osaka University, University of Southern California, Princeton University's Electric Propulsion and Plasma Dynamics Lab (EPPDyL) (where MPD thruster research has continued uninterrupted since 1967), and NASA centers (Jet Propulsion Laboratory and Glenn Research Center), has resolved many problems related to the performance, stability and lifetime of MPD thrusters.

An MPD thruster was tested on board the Japanese Space Flyer Unit as part of EPEX (Electric Propulsion Experiment) that was launched March 18, 1995 and retrieved by space shuttle mission STS-72 January 20, 1996. To date, it is the only operational MPD thruster to have flown in space as a propulsion system. Experimental prototypes were first flown on Soviet spacecraft.

The applied-field MPD thruster in development at the Institute of Space Systems of the University of Stuttgart reached a thruster efficiency of 61.99% in 2019, corresponding to a specific impulse of I_{sp} = 4665 s and 2.75 N of thrust.

== See also ==
- Hall effect thruster – Type of electric propulsion system
- Ion thruster – Form of electric spacecraft propulsion
- Magnetohydrodynamics – Model of electrically conducting fluids
- Magnetic sail – Proposed spacecraft propulsion method
- Pulsed plasma thruster – Type of propulsion for spacecraft
- Solar panels on spacecraft
- Spacecraft propulsion – Method used to accelerate spacecraft
- VASIMR – Electrothermal thruster in development
