= Victoria Coverstone =

American aerospace engineer

- Born: Victoria Lynn Coverstone
- Other name: Victoria L. Coverstone-Carroll
- Education: University of Illinois Urbana-Champaign (BS, MS, PhD)
- Known for: Trajectory optimization, Spacecraft attitude control, Solar sails
- Title: Professor Emeritus
- Awards: AIAA Fellow (2013); NASA Space Act Award (2008); Everitt Award for Teaching Excellence
- Scientific career
- Fields: Aerospace engineering, Astrodynamics
- Workplaces: University of Illinois Urbana-Champaign; Texas Tech University; University of Miami
- Doctoral advisor: John Prussing

Victoria Lynn Coverstone (also published as Victoria L. Coverstone-Carroll) is a retired American aerospace engineer, the former chair of the Department of Mechanical and Aerospace Engineering at the University of Miami, and a professor emerita at the University of Illinois Urbana-Champaign. Her research interests include spacecraft attitude control and trajectory optimization.

== Education and career ==
Aiming to become an astronaut, Coverstone studied aeronautical and astronautical engineering at the University of Illinois Urbana-Champaign, earning a bachelor's degree in 1985, master's degree in 1986, and Ph.D. in 1992. Her doctoral dissertation, Optimal cooperative power-limited rendezvous, was supervised by John Prussing. She was one of 122 astronaut candidates in her year to be interviewed at the Johnson Space Center in Houston, but ultimately was not selected because her eyesight did not meet the standard.

Instead, she remained at the University of Illinois as an assistant professor in the Department of Aeronautical & Astronautical Engineering, beginning in 1992. She was promoted to associate professor in 1998, and to full professor in 2005, also becoming Associate Dean of Graduate and Professional Programs in 2008. In 2016, she moved to Texas Tech University as a professor of mechanical engineering and Associate Dean of Undergraduate Programs, and in 2017 she moved again to the University of Miami to chair the Department of Mechanical and Aerospace Engineering.

Coverstone is also a co-founder of Champaign-Urbana Aerospace, a spinoff company from the University of Illinois, and continues to hold a leadership role at the company as Director of Astrodynamics and head of the Division of Space Systems Software.

== Recognition ==
Coverstone was named as a Fellow of the American Institute of Aeronautics and Astronautics in 2013.

After serving as the chair of the Department of Mechanical and Aerospace Engineering at the University of Miami, Coverstone retired from full-time administration and was granted Professor Emeritus status at her alma mater, the University of Illinois Urbana-Champaign.
