= Electrodeless plasma thruster =

The electrodeless plasma thruster is a spacecraft propulsion engine commercialized under the acronym "E-IMPAcT" for "Electrodeless-Ionization Magnetized Ponderomotive Acceleration Thruster". It was created by Gregory Emsellem, based on technology developed by French Atomic Energy Commission scientist Dr Richard Geller and Dr. Terenzio Consoli, for high speed plasma beam production.

The electrodeless plasma thruster was developed and adapted to various spacecraft propulsion needs by The Elwing Company between 2002 and 2015.

== Operating principle ==
1. Propellant is injected at the upstream side of the thruster body. In cases where the propellant used is not gaseous (e.g., alkali metals) at the local temperature, the propellant must be vaporized.
2. Gaseous propellant is ionized by one of the following methods:
  - bombarding the propellant with electrons emitted by a hot cathode or by an electron gun.
  - a steady state electrical discharge between two electrodes.
  - applying an alternating electric field either via a capacitive discharge or an inductive discharge or even a helicon discharge.
  - electromagnetic waves of various frequency from radio frequency up to gamma rays, which is especially useful for solid propellant in which case the propellant can be simultaneously vaporized and ionized by a laser impulse.
3. As the ionization stage is subjected to a steady magnetic field, the ionization process can use one of the numerous resonances existing in magnetized plasma, such as ion cyclotron resonance (ICR), electron cyclotron resonance (ECR) or lower hybrid oscillation, to produce a high density cold plasma.
4. The cold and dense plasma, produced by the ionization stage, then drifts toward the acceleration stage by diffusion across a region of higher magnetic field intensity.
5. In the acceleration stage the propellant plasma is accelerated by magnetized ponderomotive force in an area where both non-uniform static magnetic fields and non-uniform high-frequency electromagnetic fields are applied simultaneously.

== Advantages ==
This thruster technology can deliver large thrust density as the acceleration process is not limited by plasma density through Hall Parameter or grid electrical screening. Further, as the ponderomotive force accelerates all plasma species in the same direction, this thruster technology does not need any neutralizer. The fact that electrodeless plasma thruster is inherently multi-staged allows it to optimize both stages independently, or to throttle the thruster at constant power between higher specific impulse and higher thrust. The field of ponderomotive force is created by a non-uniform high frequency field and static magnetic field, thus it implies no grids nor contact between the plasma and any electrodes, hence it avoids most thruster erosion and spacecraft contamination issues.

== Applications ==
Propulsion systems based on electrodeless plasma thrusters seem ideally suited for orbit raising for large geostationary satellites, and would also be able to perform orbital stationkeeping, hence enabling important propellant mass savings. The ability of this technology to provide large thrust density also allows faster missions to the outer planets.

== Other research on the same phenomenon ==
The use of ponderomotive force to accelerate a plasma has recently been investigated from a theoretical point of view by Princeton Plasma Physics Laboratory scientists I. Y. Dodin, Y. Raitses and N. J. Fisch.

Some theoretical research has also been reported around the debated issue of the existence of a double layer in such a thruster, even if such a double layer structure would be current-free, as both ions and electrons travel in the same direction at the same average terminal speed. The existence of current free double layer is still debated among plasma physicists.

== See also ==
- Electrodeless plasma excitation
- Electrodeless lamp
