= Pulsed inductive thruster =

Type of spacecraft plasma propulsion system

Cross-section diagram of a pulsed inductive thruster. [1] The gas is puffed inward through a central nozzle, towards the flat electromagnetic coil where it is ionized. [2] The plasma (pink) is then accelerated to the rear by the Lorentz force.

A pulsed inductive thruster (PIT) is a form of ion thruster, used in spacecraft propulsion. It is a plasma propulsion engine using perpendicular electric and magnetic fields to accelerate a propellant with no electrode.

== Operation ==
A nozzle releases a puff of gas which spreads across a flat spiraling induction coil of wire about 1 meter across. A bank of capacitors releases a pulse of high voltage electric current of tens of kilovolts lasting 10 microseconds into the coil, generating a radial magnetic field. This induces a circular electrical field in the gas, ionizing it and causing charged particles (free electrons and ions) to revolve in the opposite direction as the original pulse of current. Because the motion of this induced current flow is perpendicular to the magnetic field, the plasma is accelerated out into space by the Lorentz force at a high exhaust velocity (10 to 100 km/s).

== Advantages ==
Unlike an electrostatic ion thruster which uses an electric field to accelerate only one species (positive ions), a PIT uses the Lorentz body force acting upon all charged particles within a quasi-neutral plasma. Unlike most other ion and plasma thrusters, it also requires no electrodes (which are susceptible to erosion) and its power can be scaled up simply by increasing the number of pulses per second. A 1-megawatt system would pulse 200 times per second.

Pulsed inductive thrusters can maintain constant specific impulse and thrust efficiency over a wide range of input power levels by adjusting the pulse rate to maintain a constant discharge energy per pulse. It has demonstrated efficiency greater than 50%.

Pulsed inductive thrusters can use a wide range of gases as a propellant, such as water, hydrazine, ammonia, argon, or xenon, among many others. Due to this ability, it has been suggested to use PITs for Martian missions: an orbiter could refuel by scooping CO_{2} from the atmosphere of Mars, compressing the gas and liquefying it into storage tanks for the return journey or another interplanetary mission, whilst orbiting the planet.

== Developments ==
Early development began with fundamental proof-of-concept studies performed in the mid-1960s. NASA conducts experiments on this device since the early 1980s.

=== PIT Mk V, VI and VII ===
NGST (Northrop Grumman Space Technology), as a contractor for NASA, built several experimental PITs.

Research efforts during the first period (1965–1973) were aimed at understanding the structure of an inductive current sheet and evaluating different concepts for propellant injection and preionization.

In the second period (1979–1988), the focus shifted more towards developing a true propulsion system and increasing the performance of the base design through incremental design changes, with the build of Mk I and Mk IV prototypes.

The third period (1991-today) began with the introduction of a new PIT thruster design known as the Mk V. It evolved into the Mk VI, developed to reproduce Mk V single-shot tests, which completely characterize thruster performance. It uses an improved coil of hollow copper tube construction and an improved propellant valve, but is electrically identical to the Mk V, using the same capacitors and switches. The Mk VII (early 2000s) has the same geometry as Mk VI, but is designed for high pulse frequency and long-duration firing with a liquid-cooled coil, longer-life capacitors, and fast, high-power solid-state switches. The goal for Mk VII is to demonstrate up to 50 pulses per second at the rated efficiency and impulse bit at 200 kW of input power in a single thruster. Mk VII design is the base for the most recent NuPIT (Nuclear-electric PIT).

The PIT has obtained relatively high performance in the laboratory environment, but it still requires additional advancements in switching technology and energy storage before becoming practical for high-power in-space applications, with the need for a nuclear-based onboard power source.

=== FARAD ===
FARAD, which stands for Faraday accelerator with radio-frequency assisted discharge, is a lower-power alternative to the PIT that has the potential for space operation using current technologies.

In the PIT, both propellant ionization and acceleration are performed by the HV pulse of current in the induction coil, while FARAD uses a separate inductive RF discharge to preionize the propellant before it is accelerated by the current pulse. This preionization allows FARAD to operate at much lower discharge energies than the PIT (100 joules per pulse vs 4 kilojoules per pulse) and allows for a reduction in the thruster's size.
