= Spacecraft electric propulsion =

Type of spacecraft propulsion using electrical energy to accelerate propellant

The Lorentz force acting on fast-moving charged particles in a bubble chamber. The Lorentz force plays a key role in several electric propulsion technologies, including Hall-effect thrusters, magnetoplasmadynamic thrusters, and pulsed plasma thrusters.

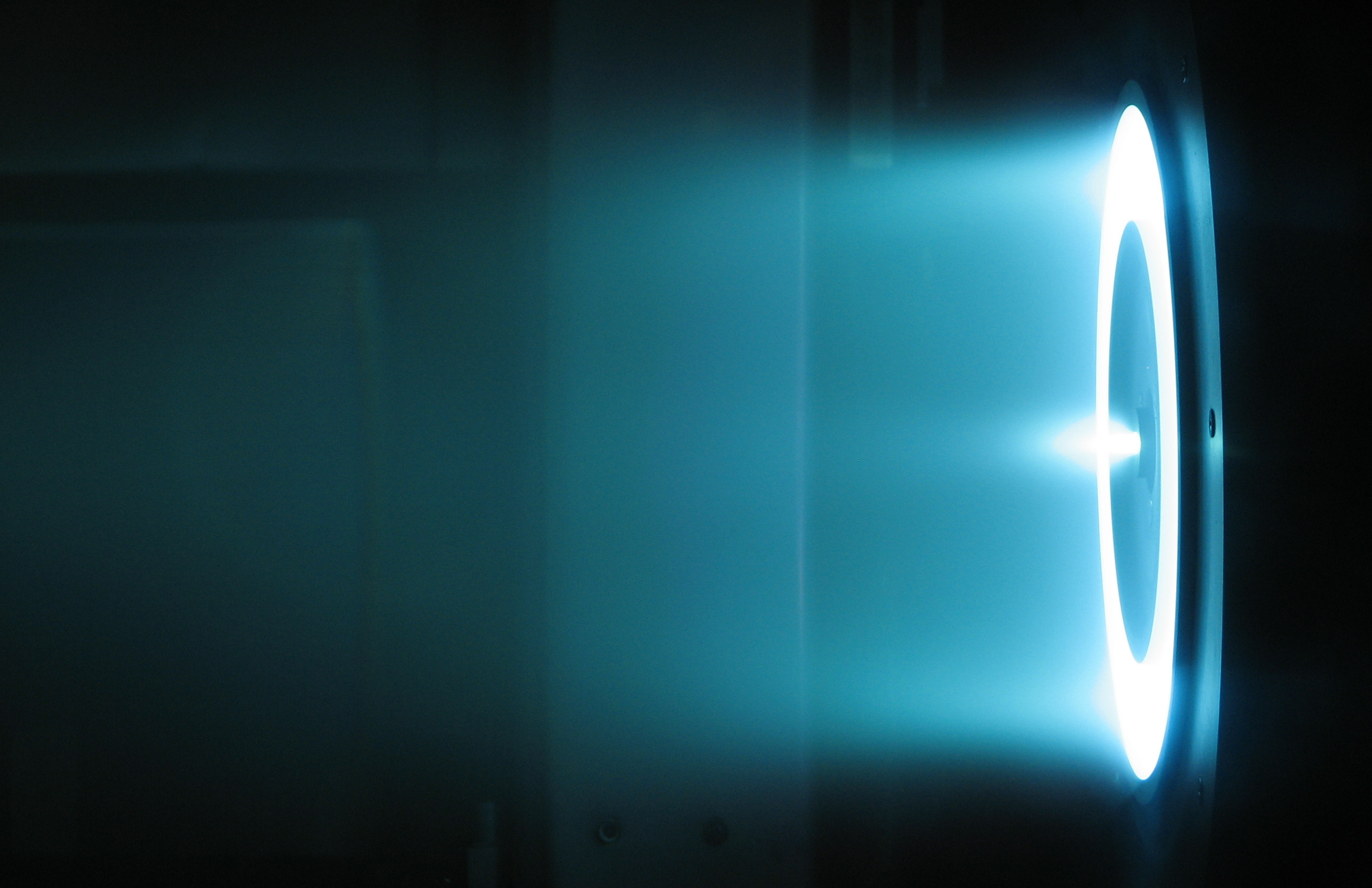
A 6 kW xenon Hall thruster in operation at the NASA Jet Propulsion Laboratory.

Spacecraft electric propulsion encompasses spacecraft propulsion systems that use electric energy to accelerate and expel propellant, generating thrust through electric or magnetic fields. Their principal advantage over chemical rockets is much higher specific impulse, meaning greater propellant efficiency, but the limited electrical power available aboard spacecraft yields much lower thrust, making electric propulsion unsuitable for launch from Earth's surface and better suited to long-duration in-space maneuvers.

The main families of spacecraft electric propulsion include electrostatic devices such as gridded ion engines, Hall-effect thrusters, and colloid thrusters; electromagnetic devices such as pulsed plasma thrusters, magnetoplasmadynamic thrusters, and pulsed inductive thrusters; and electrothermal devices such as resistojets and arcjets. Radio-frequency and electron cyclotron resonance ion engines form a further subclass that avoids physical electrode contact with the propellant plasma.

Electric propulsion concepts date to Konstantin Tsiolkovsky's 1911 writings and Robert H. Goddard's 1917 electrostatic accelerator patent, with the first laboratory thruster built by Valentin Glushko at the Gas Dynamics Laboratory in 1933. The first electric engine operated in space aboard SERT-1 in 1964, and Hall-effect thrusters entered operational service on Soviet Meteor spacecraft in the 1970s. After the Cold War, Western researchers gained direct access to Soviet Hall thruster technology, and by the late 1990s electric propulsion had entered routine commercial geostationary satellite service and deep-space primary propulsion with Deep Space 1. Later milestones include Dawn's ion-propelled orbits of Vesta and Ceres, BepiColombo's high-performance gridded ion thruster system, and Psyche's first use of Hall Effect thrusters in interplanetary space.

== Background and history ==
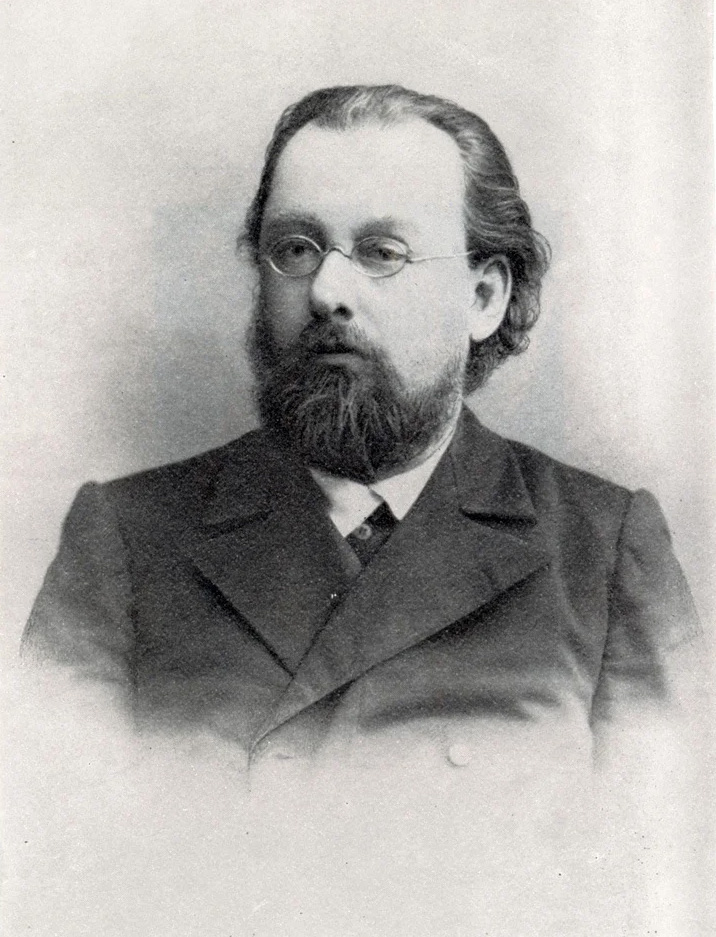
Konstantin Tsiolkovsky in 1911 predicted that electricity may some day propel vehicles.

Traditional rocketry has dominated aerospace propulsion in the 20th and early 21st centuries. Conventional rockets achieve motion by expelling mass, most commonly the combustion output from chemical propellants to generate thrust via Newton's third law, which is the familiar rocket launch with explosive flame and smoke beneath it. Electric propulsion developed as a parallel track for spacecraft propulsion, focusing on electrical and electrostatic methods of accelerating propellant rather than relying solely on chemical combustion.

=== 1900s to the 1950s ===
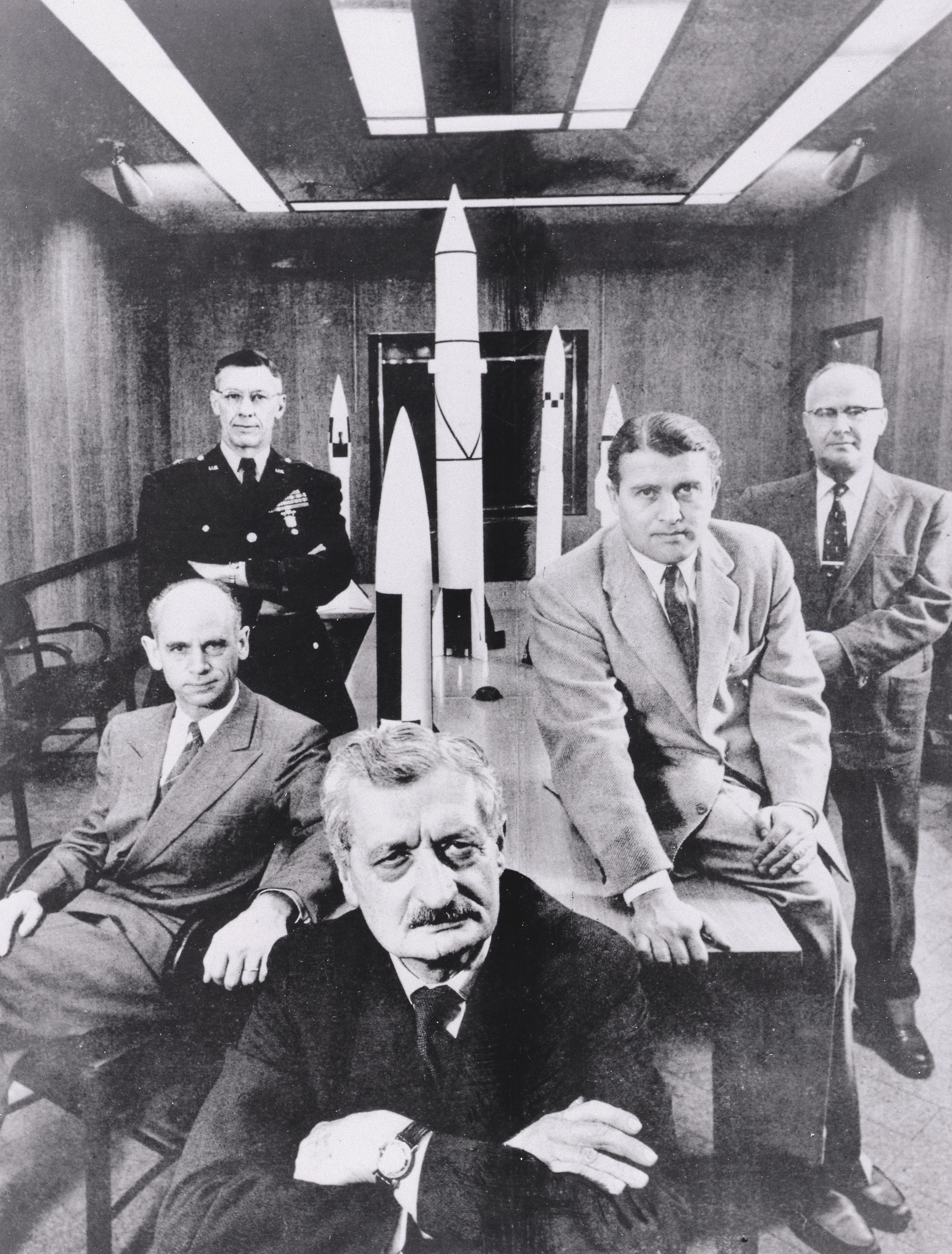
Hermann Oberth (center), with (l-r) Ernst Stuhlinger, Holger Toftoy, Wernher von Braun, and Robert Lusser at Marshall Space Flight Center. Oberth is credited with defining electric propulsion concepts as a "serious and worthy pursuit in astronautics".

Early antecedents of electric propulsion emerged by the early 20th century. Konstantin Tsiolkovsky writing in 1911 included an early published statement of the basic electric-propulsion idea: using electricity to increase the velocity of ejected particles. Tsiolkovsky wrote:

It is possible that in time we may use electricity to produce a large velocity for the particles ejected from a rocket device.

Early work on electrostatic acceleration dates to Robert H. Goddard, whose 1917 patent application (granted 1920) Edgar Choueiri has described in Journal of Propulsion and Power as the first documented electrostatic ion accelerator intended for propulsion. In his 1918-1919 manuscript "To whomsoever will read in order to build", Yuri Kondratyuk discussed electric propulsion in the context of cathode rays and described thrust from electrically discharging and repelling material particles, alongside a schematic that Choueiri noted may be the "first conceptualization of a colloid thruster". Hermann Oberth's 1929 book Wege zur Raumschiffahrt defined, in Edgar Choueiri's assessment, 'for the first time publicly and unambiguously' that related propulsion concepts were 'a serious and worthy pursuit in astronautics'.

During the interwar period, early electric-propulsion work began moving from theory toward experiment. Valentin Glushko joined the Gas Dynamics Laboratory in Leningrad in 1929, and by 1933 with staff developed an early electric thruster prototype, an electrothermal approach intended for spacecraft propulsion. The device was likely the first electric thruster to ever be studied on a thruster stand, and was the first electrothermal thruster ever built.

According to Choueiri, early thinking and experimentation in related propulsion research focused mainly on electrostatic concepts, but the first laboratory electric thruster was electrothermal and the first electric thruster to fly in space was a mostly electromagnetic pulsed plasma device. After the 1930s, related electric-propulsion research reached a lull in public published activity for over a decade through and after World War II.

The postwar period saw growing institutional interest in electric propulsion within both military and civilian research programs. The first clear postwar reappearance of these propulsion concepts in open scientific literature was in December 1945, in the Journal of the American Rocket Society, where the term "ion rocket" was first coined by Herbert Radd. In 1947 at Fort Bliss, Wernher von Braun encouraged Ernst Stuhlinger to investigate his spacecraft propulsion ideas, telling Stuhlinger, "I wouldn't be a bit surprised if one day we flew to Mars electrically!"

=== 1960s-1970s ===
During the 1960s through the 1970s, electric and electromagnetic propulsion matured experimentally, with some systems flying in limited operational roles. Electric propulsion research during this period expanded across multiple countries and institutional settings.

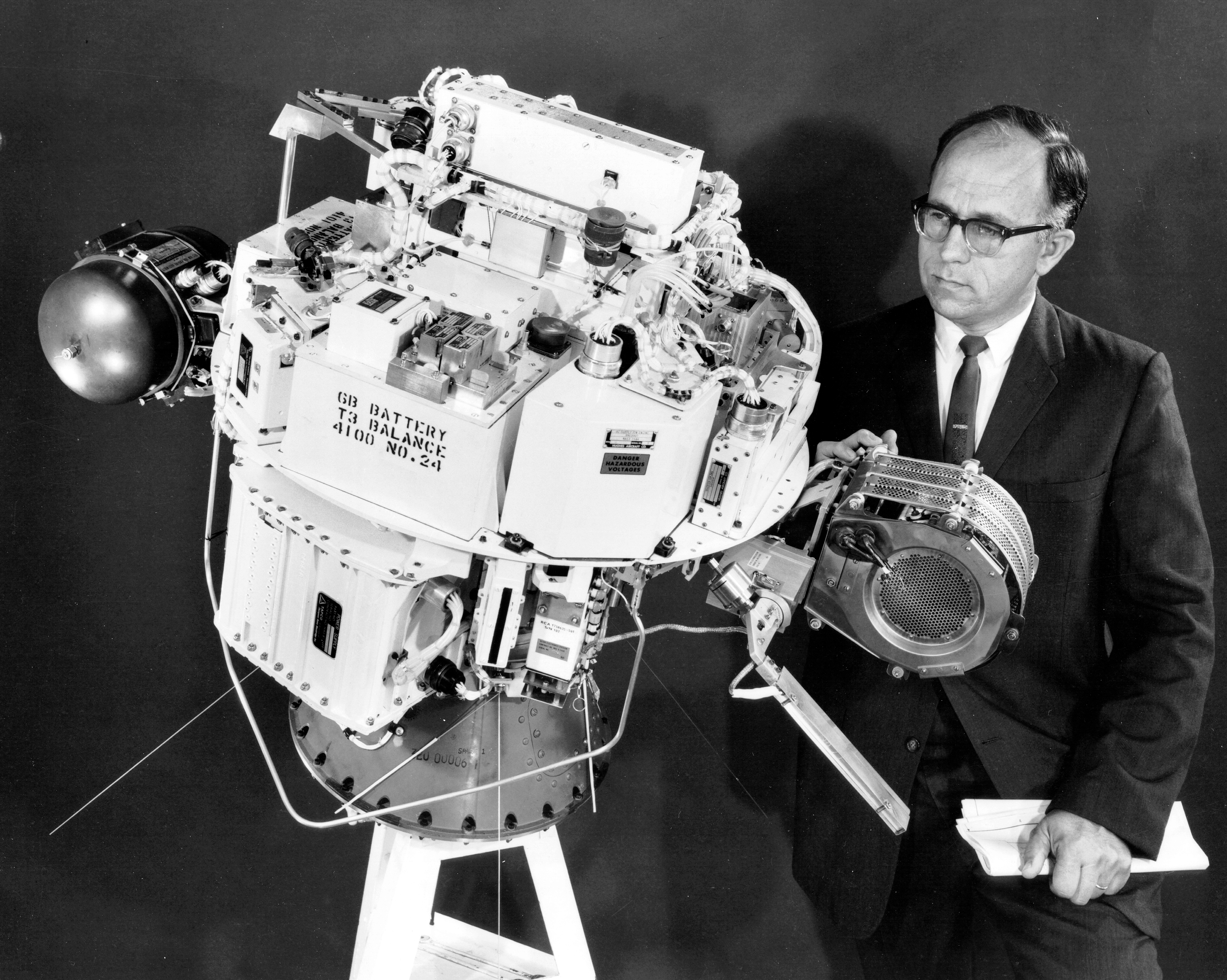
SERT-1 was the first ion engine NASA spacecraft, launched on July 20, 1964.

In West Germany, electric-propulsion development also proceeded from 1960 at German Aerospace Center (DLR) institutes in Stuttgart and Braunschweig and at the University of Giessen. At Gießen, Horst Löb's group began development of radio-frequency ion thrusters of the RIT type, which use radio frequency fields rather than physical electrodes to ionize propellant, starting with the conception, laboratory model, and first tests of the RIT-10; the prototype was further improved through the 1960s and transferred to industry for qualification in 1970. A June 1960 decree of the Central Committee and Council of Ministers (No. 715-296), declassified after the Soviet period, directed the development of "space electric rocket engines". This included ion and electroplasma thrusters with target specific impulse of 5,000-10,000 seconds, a measure of propellant efficiency, assigning work to OKB-1, the Kurchatov Institute, and other named bureaus as part of a broader 1960-1967 Soviet Union space development plan. In 1964, Ernst Stuhlinger published Ion Propulsion for Space Flight, characterized by Choueiri as the first comprehensive book on electric rocket technology, marking the field's transition into a serious engineering discipline.

On 20 July 1964, two electrostatic ion engines were tested in space in the Space Electric Rocket Test (SERT I), and the mercury electron-bombardment engine produced thrust in flight. SERT I was the first spacecraft to incorporate electric propulsion; its mercury electron bombardment ion engine, which ionizes mercury vapor by bombarding it with electrons and then accelerates the resulting ions electrically, ran for 31 minutes, becoming the first electric engine to operate in space. A 1966 NASA Lewis Research Center overview stated that electric-propulsion spacecraft then under study could not be expected to take off from Earth and therefore would need to be launched to Earth orbit by chemical rockets before beginning low-thrust operation. The 30 November 1964 Zond 2 mission to Mars from the Soviet Union marked the first planetary use of electric propulsion. Following the Zond 2 demonstration, pulsed plasma thruster development was transferred from the Kurchatov Institute to OKB Fakel, whose "Globus" pulsed propulsion unit flew in 1968. The follow-on Space Electric Rocket Test II (SERT II), launched on 3 February 1970, was the first long-duration operation of ion thrusters in space; its two mercury electron-bombardment engines accumulated over 5 months and 3.5 months of continuous operation respectively, and after intermittent restarts, one thruster logged over 11 years of total operation through 1981.

Alongside ion engine development, a distinct line of electromagnetic thruster research was advancing in the Soviet Union. In the 1960s, A. I. Morozov proposed the stationary plasma thruster (SPT), a Hall-effect device that accelerates ionized propellant using perpendicular electric and magnetic fields. Within decades, hundreds would fly in space.

The first SPT was tested in orbit aboard a Meteor spacecraft in 1972, with corrective propulsion units operating on further Meteor missions through 1980.

=== 1980s ===
Commercial electrothermal propulsion entered operational satellite service during this period. Hydrazine resistojets, electric thrusters that heat propellant before expelling it, began commercial geostationary north-south orbital station-keeping, used to maintain orbital position, with Intelsat V in 1980.

=== 1990s ===
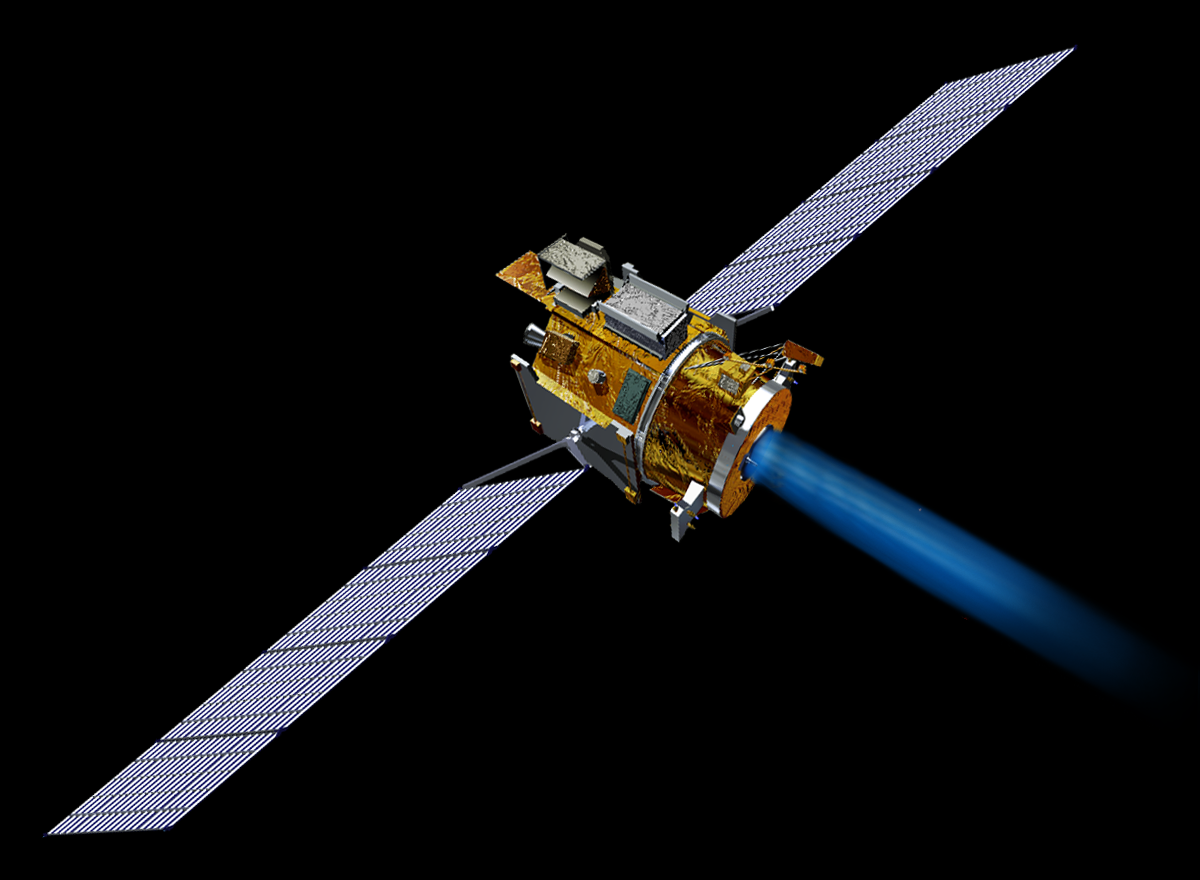
Artist concept of Deep Space 1 firing its ion thrusters in space.

The end of the Cold War opened access to previously restricted Soviet electric propulsion technology. U.S. electric propulsion specialists traveled to Russia in 1991 to evaluate the Russian SPT-100 at the Scientific-Research Institute of Thermal Processes in Moscow and at Fakel in Kaliningrad using U.S. instrumentation. Brophy's subsequent JPL report said the measured performance appeared close to the advertised values, and noted claims that more than fifty lower-power SPT units had already flown on Russian spacecraft. The report laid out a second program phase in which thrusters would be brought to the United States for testing toward possible Western use. That work fed into the later Ballistic Missile Defense Organization Russian Hall Electric Thruster Technology (RHETT) effort to move Hall thruster technology toward Western operational use.

Electric-propulsion work matured across the decade. Hydrazine-based arcjet rockets were deployed in 1993 on Telstar 401, extending electrothermal electric propulsion into higher-performance commercial geostationary use.

Alongside these experimental programs, electric propulsion was also entering routine commercial service. Commercial electric propulsion also entered Western geostationary satellite operations in the 1990s, as Hughes Boeing 601HP communications satellites began using gridded xenon ion thrusters (XIPS) for station-keeping in 1997. After initial Russian usage from the 1970s, beginning in the 1990s qualified SPT units entered service on American and European spacecraft as well. European electric propulsion programs reached similar milestones in the years that followed. The Gießen RIT line later reached flight application on the European Space Agency's Artemis satellite, launched in 2001, which carried two German RIT-10 thrusters for station-keeping. By the late 1990s, ESA was already positioning solar electric primary propulsion as a key technology for future deep-space missions through SMART-1, whose PPS-1350-G Hall thruster was later developed in the CNES Stentor satellite program and adapted from a geostationary station-keeping design.

By the late 1990s, electric propulsion had moved from experimental and military programs into routine commercial satellite operations, particularly for geostationary station-keeping, orbit raising, and related orbit-control maneuvers. Deep Space 1 became the first U.S. space mission to use an ion thruster as its primary means of propulsion through 1998, validating NASA's NSTAR solar electric propulsion system in long-duration flight.

=== 21st century ===
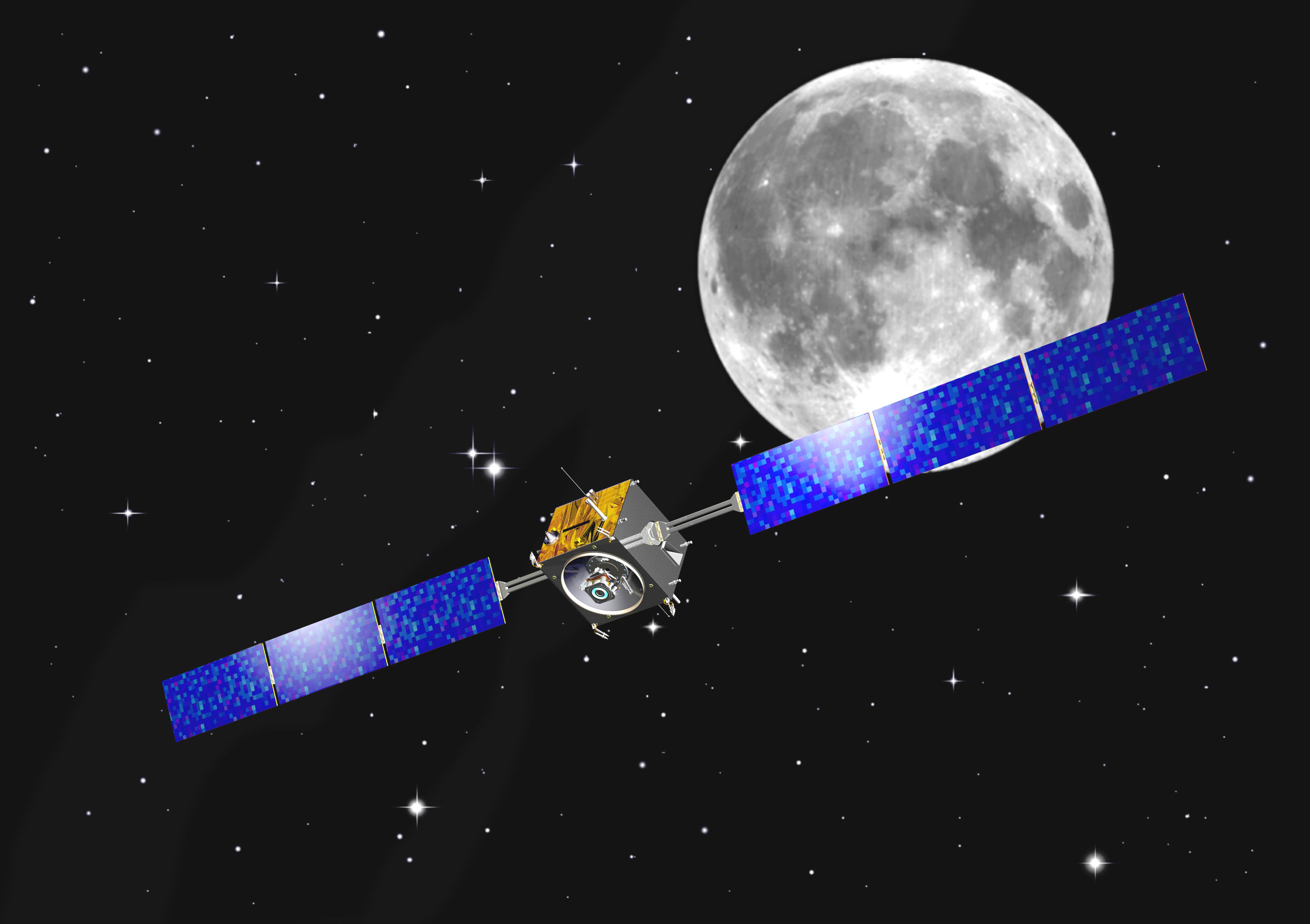
Artist's impression of the SMART-1 mission.

SMART-1, launched in 2003, demonstrated solar electric primary propulsion in flight for ESA and carried the Hall thruster system that had been developed from late-1990s European work on commercial electric-propulsion applications and deep-space mission preparation.

While electric-propulsion research and deployment continued, new systems were also launched into space. Hayabusa was launched by the Japan Aerospace Exploration Agency in 2003, propelled by electrodeless plasma thruster technology. By 2012, more than 270 Hall-effect SPT units had operated on over 60 Russian spacecraft. NASA's Dawn became the first spacecraft to orbit an object in the main asteroid belt at Vesta in 2011, and the first to orbit a dwarf planet at Ceres in 2015. Its ion propulsion system made Dawn the only spacecraft ever to orbit two extraterrestrial destinations. ESA's GOCE in 2009 and JAXA's Super Low Altitude Test Satellite "TSUBAME" (2017-2019) marked later electric-propulsion milestones by demonstrating continuous drag compensation and ion-engine-supported super-low-altitude operations in very low Earth orbit.

ESA and JAXA's BepiColombo, launched in 2018, marked a later major milestone in solar electric propulsion when its Solar Electric Propulsion System began in-flight commissioning in November 2018, in what ESA described as the first in-flight operation of the most powerful and highest-performance electric propulsion system flown on any space mission to date.

In November 2023, Psyche became the first spacecraft to use Hall effect thrusters in interplanetary space, beyond the Earth-Moon system. The spacecraft uses its electric thrusters for both primary propulsion and momentum control and carries no chemical propulsion system. It is scheduled to enter orbit around the asteroid (16) Psyche in 2029.

== Definitions ==
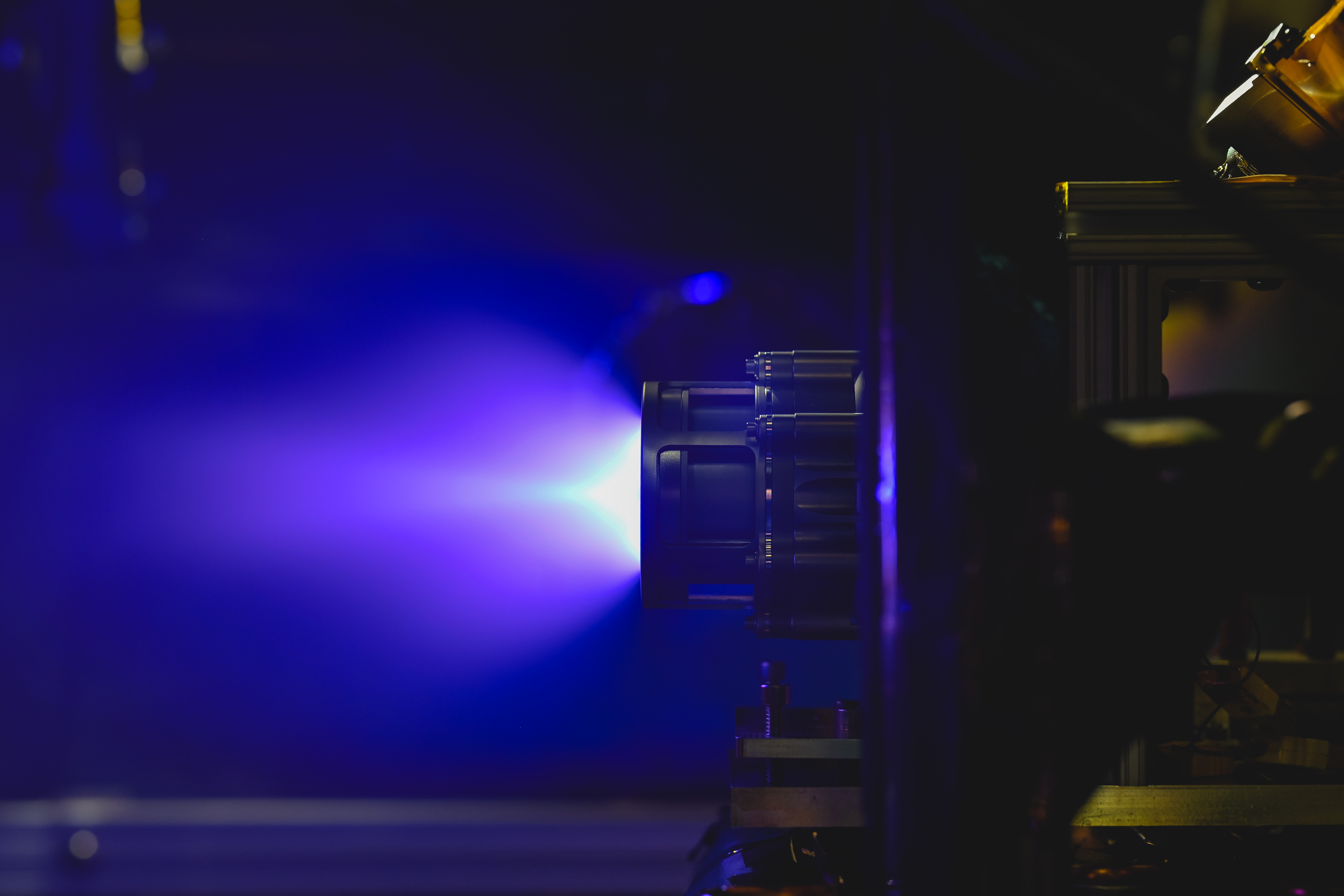
A Hall-effect thruster fires on krypton in a lab.

Spacecraft electric propulsion is generally classified by how electrical energy is used to accelerate propellant: electrothermal systems heat propellant before expansion, electrostatic systems accelerate ions through electric fields, and electromagnetic systems accelerate plasma through the interaction of electric currents and magnetic fields. Over time, the boundaries between these classes have sometimes been drawn differently in surveys and program literature, especially for devices that combine more than one acceleration mechanism.

Within electric and electromagnetic propulsion, thrust is generated by accelerating and expelling propellant using electric or magnetic fields rather than by coupling to an external environment. Examples include electrostatic ion engines, Hall-effect thrusters, pulsed plasma thrusters, magnetoplasmadynamic thrusters, pulsed inductive thrusters, electrothermal thrusters, and radio-frequency or electron-cyclotron-resonance ion engines.

Conservation of momentum remains a fundamental requirement because these systems close momentum through exhaust rather than through external fields or media.

== Types ==
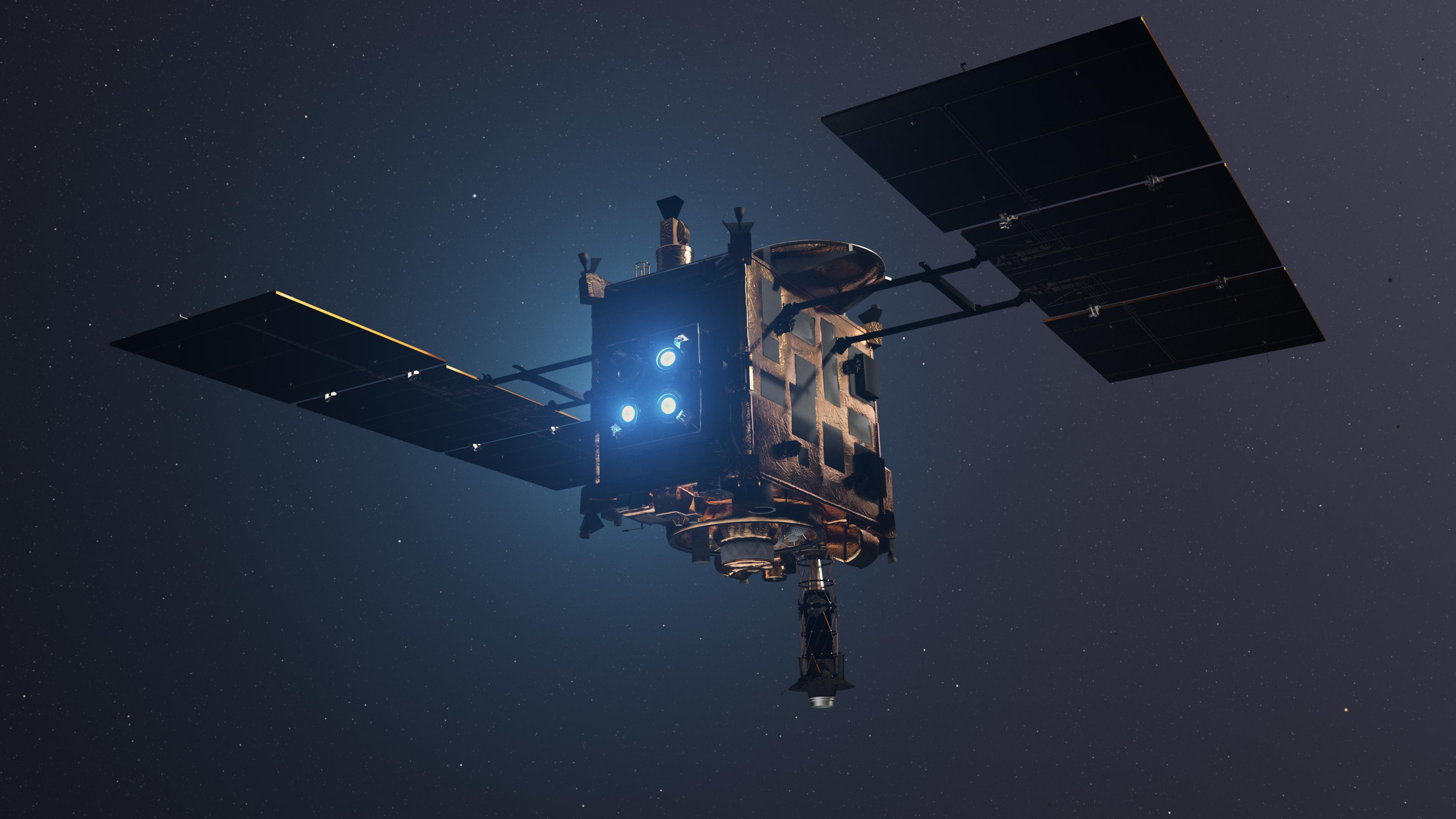
Rendering of Hayabusa 2's ion propulsion system in use.

A wide range of electric propulsion methods have been proposed or demonstrated. Spacecraft electric propulsion is commonly grouped into electrothermal, electrostatic, and electromagnetic systems according to how electrical energy is used to heat, ionize, and accelerate propellant. Electric propulsion is most useful in missions where propellant efficiency matters more than rapid acceleration. In practice it has been used for geostationary station-keeping, orbit raising, deep-space probes, precision attitude and position control, and drag compensation in Earth orbit. These advantages come with operational tradeoffs: low-thrust transfers can require longer maneuver times and, in some cases, higher total delta-v than impulsive chemical maneuvers, so combined chemical-electric mission profiles remain common when transfer time is constrained.

=== Demonstrated ===
Various electric and electromagnetic propulsion approaches and systems have achieved experimental validation, flight heritage, or sustained engineering development.

==== Electric and electromagnetic with carried propellant ====
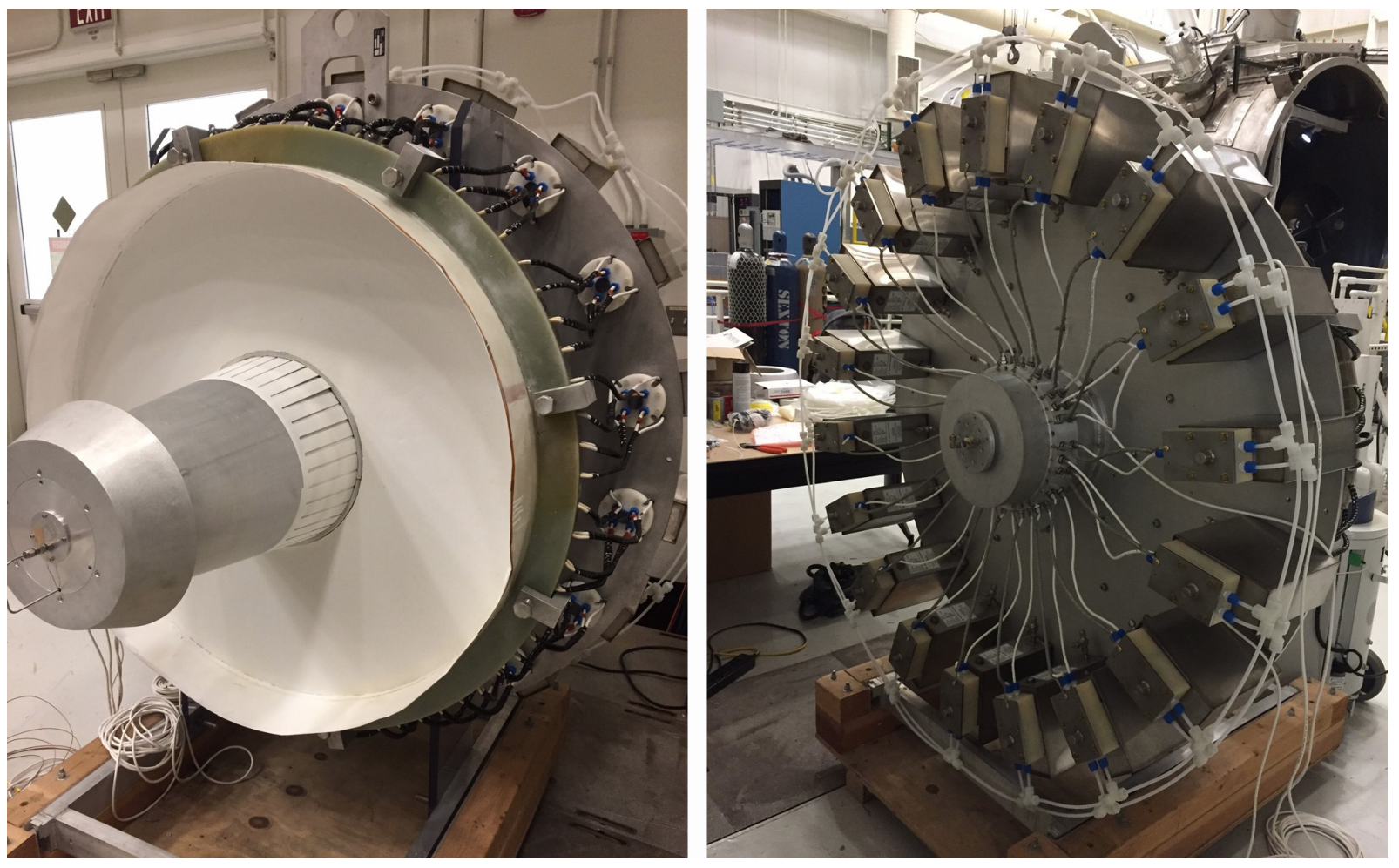
Front and rear views of the PIT MkVI pulsed inductive thrusters during their assembly process.

Three families of electromagnetic thruster, pulsed plasma thrusters (PPTs), magnetoplasmadynamic thrusters (MPD), and pulsed inductive thrusters (PIT), rely on strong fields. The three differ in lifetime, efficiency, and power scaling, but share advantages common to electromagnetic acceleration: high specific impulse, precision suitable for satellite positioning, robustness, high power processing capability, and relatively simple system-level scaling with available spacecraft power.

PPTs are the only electromagnetic thrusters used on operational satellites. Solid-propellant PPTs first flew in the Soviet Union in 1964 and in the United States in 1968; they initiate an arc discharge across a solid fluorinated polymer bar, ablating a small amount of propellant and accelerating it by the Lorentz body force. Their compact, low-power, pulsed configurations make them suited to satellite positioning and drag compensation, unlike later concepts that rely on inductive or steady-state operation.

MPDs generate thrust through the Lorentz force produced by the interaction of discharge currents with self-induced or externally applied magnetic fields, and have been investigated for both quasi-steady and steady-state spaceflight applications. MPD thrusters have also flown in space in experimental regimes.

The PIT concept originated in the late 1960s and evolved through successive experimental designs focused on performance scaling, circuit optimization, and propellant compatibility. PITs were developed to overcome the erosion and lifetime limitations of electrode-based systems by inducing plasma currents through time-varying magnetic fields, accelerating neutral propellants without physical contact between conductors and plasma. No PIT system has flown in space, but the thruster class remains of interest for high-efficiency, long-duration propulsion with minimal material degradation, particularly in missions requiring flexible propellant selection and reduced contamination risk.

Electron cyclotron resonance thrusters (ECR) use electron cyclotron resonance, in which microwaves transfer energy to electrons spiraling in a magnetic field, to ionize and accelerate a gaseous propellant (commonly xenon), particularly in ionospheric or high-altitude environments. ECRs using electron cyclotron resonance with microwave discharge have flown in space, most notably as the μ10 ion engine system on JAXA's Hayabusa and Hayabusa2 asteroid missions.

Stationary plasma thrusters (SPT), also called Hall-effect thrusters, accelerate ionized propellant (typically xenon) using perpendicular electric and magnetic fields and a circulating electron current. The concept was proposed by A. I. Morozov in the early 1960s, and a 1968 paper on near-wall conductivity in strongly magnetized plasma provided key theoretical grounding for the discharge channel physics. The first SPT was tested in space aboard a Meteor spacecraft launched in December 1971, with orbital firings conducted between February and June 1972; subsequent corrective propulsion units operated on further Meteor missions through 1980. By 2012, more than 270 SPD-70 and SPD-100 thrusters had operated on over 60 Russian spacecraft, and beginning in the 1990s qualified SPT units entered service on American and European spacecraft as well.

The Gießen RIT line used a radio-frequency, electrode-less xenon discharge, a design Löb described as avoiding electrode-related wear while offering high efficiency and high exhaust velocity.

=== Development and testing ===
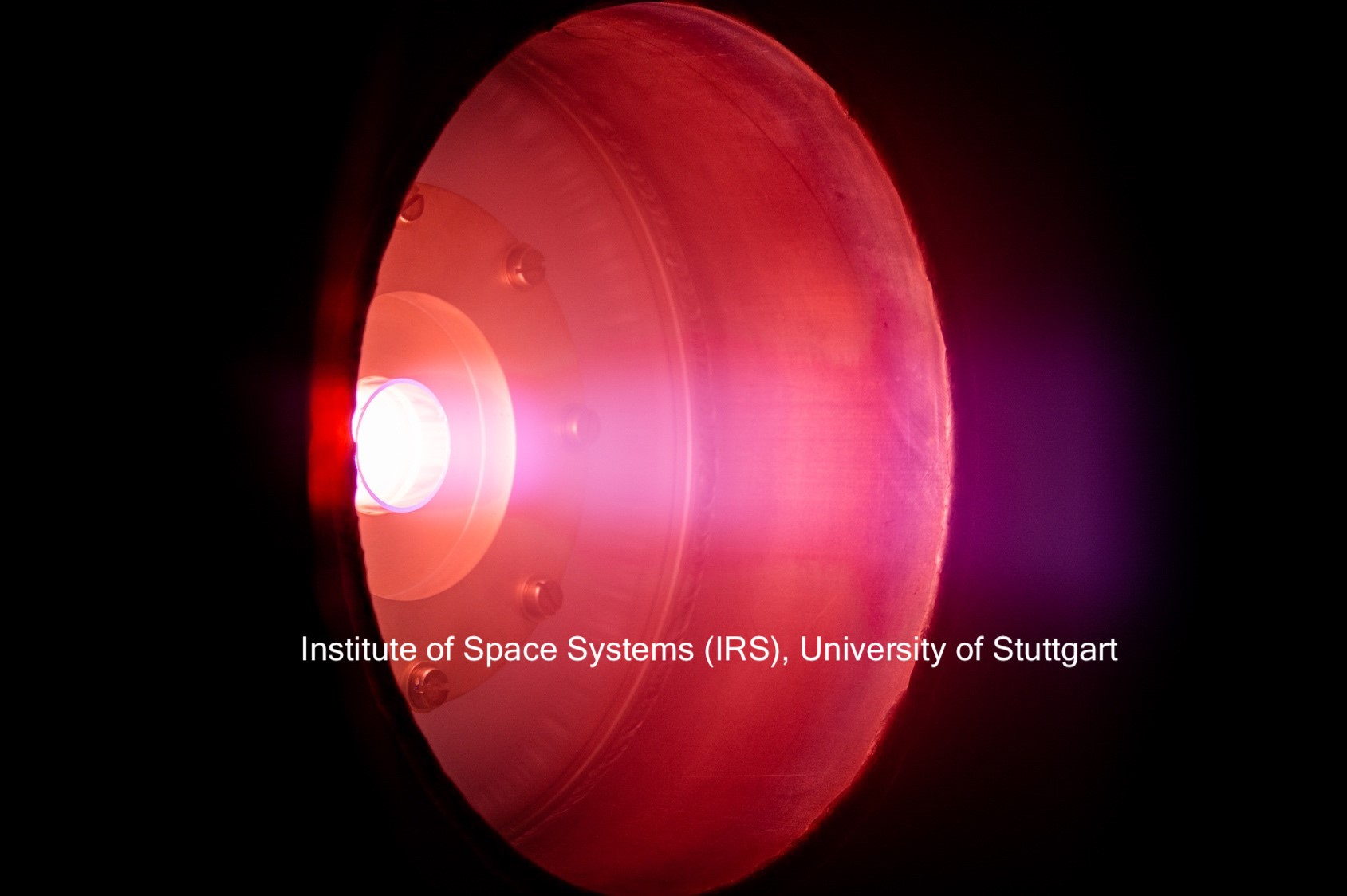
RF Helicon-based Plasma Thruster (IPT) prototype operating on nitrogen.

These are concepts under active engineering development or testing that adapt electric or electromagnetic propulsion principles for new operational regimes.

==== Environment-fed electric propulsion ====
Atmosphere-breathing electric propulsion is a concept in which a spacecraft collects residual atmospheric particles in very low Earth orbit, ionizes them, and accelerates them electromagnetically instead of carrying all propellant onboard. A 2018 European Space Agency technology demonstration was described as the first firing of an air-breathing electric thruster using collected atmospheric molecules as propellant, but no such system has yet flown in space.

Related operational milestones in very low Earth orbit preceded true atmosphere-breathing concepts. ESA's Gravity Field and Steady-State Ocean Circulation Explorer (GOCE), launched on 17 March 2009, became the first-ever mission to fly drag free in low Earth orbit using an electric propulsion system that continually compensated atmospheric drag. JAXA's Super Low Altitude Test Satellite (SLATS) "TSUBAME", launched on 23 December 2017, transitioned to ion-engine orbit-keeping operations in April 2019 and later demonstrated maintenance of six orbital altitudes between 271.1 and 181.1 km, validating super-low-altitude Earth observation operations.

== Selected milestones ==
The following table summarizes selected systems and mission milestones in spacecraft electric propulsion, including both flight-proven applications and developmental concepts discussed in this article.

Selected milestones in spacecraft electric propulsion
System / milestone	Domain	First demonstrated usage	Date	Vehicle / mission	Maturity	Remarks
Electrothermal thruster	Space	First electric thruster built and tested on a thruster stand	1933	Gas Dynamics Laboratory prototype (Valentin Glushko)	Ground tested	Carried propellant; first electric thruster ever studied on a stand.
Electrostatic ion engine	Space	First electric propulsion spacecraft; mercury electron-bombardment engine operated 31 minutes	1964	SERT I (NASA)	Operational	Carried propellant; first electric engine to operate in space.
Pulsed plasma thruster (PPT)	Space	First electromagnetic thruster flown in space; first planetary use of electric propulsion	1964	Zond 2 (Soviet Union, Mars mission)	Operational	Carried propellant; solid-propellant PPTs also flew in the U.S. in 1968.
Pulsed inductive thruster (PIT)	Space	Successive experimental designs from MkI through MkVI focused on performance scaling and propellant compatibility	1968	PIT MkI–MkVI laboratory series	Ground tested	Carried propellant; developed to overcome electrode erosion limits of PPTs and MPDs; no flight to date.
Electrostatic ion engine (long-duration)	Space	First long-duration ion thruster operation in space; one thruster logged over 11 years of total operation	1970	SERT II (NASA)	Operational	Carried propellant (mercury); two electron-bombardment engines accumulated months of continuous thrust; validated long-life ion propulsion.
Hall-effect thruster (SPT)	Space	First SPT tested in orbit; corrective firings on Meteor spacecraft	1972	Meteor (Kurchatov Institute / OKB Fakel)	Operational	Carried propellant (xenon); proposed by Morozov early 1960s; 270+ units flown on 60+ Russian spacecraft by 2012.
Electrostatic ion engine (primary propulsion)	Space	First U.S. space mission to use an ion thruster as its primary means of propulsion	1998	Deep Space 1 (NASA)	Operational	Carried propellant (xenon); validated NSTAR solar electric propulsion system in long-duration flight.
ECR ion engine	Space	μ10 microwave-discharge ion engine system	2003	Hayabusa (JAXA)	Operational	Carried propellant (xenon); also flew on Hayabusa2 (2014).
Hall-effect thruster (primary propulsion)	Space	First ESA mission to use solar electric propulsion as primary propulsion	2003	SMART-1 (ESA)	Operational	Carried propellant (xenon); PPS-1350-G Hall thruster developed from late-1990s European geostationary station-keeping designs.
Electric propulsion (drag-free flight)	Space	First mission to fly drag-free in low Earth orbit using continuous electric propulsion	2009	GOCE (ESA)	Operational	Carried propellant; electric propulsion system continually compensated atmospheric drag throughout mission.
Electrostatic ion engine (dual-destination)	Space	First spacecraft to orbit two extraterrestrial destinations; first to orbit a body in the asteroid belt and first to orbit a dwarf planet	2011	Dawn (NASA)	Operational	Carried propellant (xenon); ion propulsion enabled orbit of Vesta (2011) and Ceres (2015).
Electrostatic ion engine (high-performance)	Space	Most powerful and highest-performance electric propulsion system flown on any space mission at time of commissioning	2018	BepiColombo (ESA / JAXA)	Operational	Carried propellant; Solar Electric Propulsion System began in-flight commissioning November 2018.
Atmosphere-breathing electric propulsion	Space	First ground firing of an air-breathing electric thruster (intake + thruster), including ignition using atmospheric propellant	2018	ESA TRP / Sitael RAM-EP ground test (simulated ~200 km environment)	Ground tested	ESA described this as a world-first firing of an air-breathing electric thruster concept using collected atmospheric molecules as propellant.
Hall-effect thruster (interplanetary)	Space	First use of hall-effect thrusters in interplanetary space	2023	Psyche (NASA)	Operational	Carried propellant (xenon); Hall thrusters fired for the first time in interplanetary space November 2023.

== See also ==
- Bussard ramjet – Proposed spacecraft propulsion method
- Emerging technologies – Technology still to be fully developed
- Field propulsion – Propulsion concepts and technologies
- History of aviation
- History of rockets
- History of spaceflight
- New Millennium Program – NASA projects to test new space technologies
- Non-rocket spacelaunch – Concepts for launch into space
- Timeline of aviation
- Timeline of rocket and missile technology
- Timeline of spaceflight
