= Electrodeless plasma excitation =

Electrodeless plasma excitation methods include helicon plasma sources, inductively coupled plasmas, and surface-wave-sustained discharges.

Electrodeless high-frequency discharges (HF) have two important advantages over plasmas using electrodes, like capacitively coupled plasmas that are of great interest for contemporary plasma research and applications:

- Firstly, no sputtering of the electrodes occurs. However, depending on ion energy, sputtering of the reactor walls or the substrate may still occur. Under conditions typical for plasma modification purposes, the ion energy in electrodeless HF discharges is about an order of magnitude lower than in RF discharges. This way, the contamination of the gas phase and damage of the substrate surface can be reduced.
- Secondly, the surface-wave effect allows to generate spatially extended plasmas with electron densities that exceed the critical density.
