= Cold gas thruster =

Type of rocket engine

A cold gas thruster (or a cold gas propulsion system) is a type of rocket engine which uses the expansion of a (typically inert) pressurized gas to generate thrust. As opposed to traditional rocket engines, a cold gas thruster does not house any combustion and therefore has lower thrust and efficiency compared to conventional monopropellant or bipropellant rocket engines. Cold gas thrusters have been referred to as the "simplest manifestation of a rocket engine" because their design consists only of a fuel tank, a regulating valve, a propelling nozzle, and the little required plumbing. They are the cheapest, simplest, and most reliable propulsion systems available for orbital maintenance, maneuvering and attitude control.

Cold gas thrusters are predominantly used to provide stabilization for smaller space missions which require contaminant-free operation. Specifically, CubeSat propulsion system development has been focused on cold gas systems because CubeSats have strict regulations against pyrotechnics and hazardous materials.

== Design ==
Schematic of a cold gas propulsion system

The nozzle of a cold gas thruster is generally a convergent-divergent nozzle that provides the required thrust in flight. The nozzle is shaped such that the high-pressure, low-velocity gas that enters the nozzle is accelerated as it approaches the throat (the narrowest part of the nozzle), where the gas velocity matches the speed of sound.

== Performance ==
Cold gas thrusters benefit from their simplicity; however, they do fall short in other respects. The advantages and disadvantages of a cold gas system can be summarized as:

=== Advantages ===
- A lack of combustion in the nozzle of a cold gas thruster allows its usage in situations where regular liquid rocket engines would be too hot. This eliminates the need to engineer heat management systems.
- The simple design allows the thrusters to be smaller than regular rocket engines, which makes them a suitable choice for missions with limited volume and weight requirements.
- The cold gas system and its fuel are inexpensive compared to regular rocket engines.
- The simple design is less prone to failures than a traditional rocket engine.
- The fuels used in a cold gas system are safe to handle both before and after firing the engine. If inert fuel is used the cold gas system is one of the safest possible rocket engines.
- Cold gas thrusters do not build up a net charge on the spacecraft during operation.
- Cold gas thrusters require very little electrical energy to operate, which is useful, for example, when a spacecraft is in the shadow of the planet it is orbiting.

=== Disadvantages ===
- A cold gas system cannot produce the high thrust that combustive rocket engines can achieve.
- The maximum thrust of a cold gas thruster is dependent upon the pressure in the storage tank. As fuel is used up with simple compressed-gas systems, the pressure decreases and maximum thrust decreases. With liquefied gases, pressure will remain relatively constant as the liquid gas volatilizes and is used up in a manner similar to aerosol cans.

=== Thrust ===
Thrust is generated by momentum exchange between the exhaust and the spacecraft, which is given by Newton's second law as $F=\dot{m}V_e$ where $\dot{m}$ is the mass flow rate, and $V_e$ is the velocity of the exhaust.

For a cold gas thruster in space, where the thrusters are designed for infinite expansion (since the ambient pressure is zero), the thrust is given as

$F=A_tP_c\gamma \left [ \left (\frac{2}{\gamma - 1}\right ) \left( \frac{2}{\gamma + 1} \right) \left (1 - \frac{P_e}{P_c} \right) \right ] + P_eA_e$

Where $A_t$ is the area of the throat, $P_c$ is the chamber pressure in the nozzle, $\gamma$ is the specific heat ratio, $P_e$ is the exit pressure of the propellant, and $A_e$ is the exit area of the nozzle.

=== Specific Impulse ===
The specific impulse (I_{sp}) of a rocket engine is the most important metric of efficiency; a high specific impulse is normally desired. Cold gas thrusters have a significantly lower specific impulse than most other rocket engines because they do not take advantage of chemical energy stored in the propellant. The theoretical specific impulse for cold gases is given by

$I_{sp} = \frac{C^*}{g_0} \gamma \sqrt{\left ( \frac{2}{\gamma - 1} \right) \left ( \frac{2}{\gamma +1} \right )^ \frac{\gamma + 1}{\gamma - 1} \left ( 1 - \frac{P_e}{P_c} \right ) ^ {\frac{\gamma - 1}{\gamma}} }$

where $g_0$ is standard gravity and $C^*$ is the characteristic velocity which is given by

$C^* = \frac{a_0}{\gamma \left( \frac{2}{\gamma + 1} \right) ^ \frac{\gamma +1}{2(\gamma - 1)}}$

where $a_0$ is the sonic velocity of the propellant.

== Propellants ==
Cold gas systems can use either a solid, liquid or gaseous propellant storage system; but the propellant must exit the nozzle in gaseous form. Storing liquid propellant may pose attitude control issues due to the sloshing of fuel in its tank.

When choosing a propellant, a high specific impulse, and a high specific impulse per unit volume of propellant should be considered.

Overview of the specific impulses of propellants suitable for a cold gas propulsion system:

Propellants and Efficiencies
Cold Gas	Molecular weight M (u)	Theoretical I_{sp} (sec)	Measured I_{sp} (sec)	Density (g/cm^{3})
H_{2}	2.0	296	272	0.02
He	4.0	179	165	0.04
Ne	20.2	82	75	0.19
N_{2}	28.0	80	73	0.28
O_{2}	32.0	?		
Ar	40.0	57	52	0.44
Kr	83.8	39	37	1.08
Xe	131.3	31	28	2.74
CCl_{2}F_{2} (Freon-12)	120.9	46	37	Liquid
CF_{4}	88.0	55	45	0.96
CH_{4}	16.0	114	105	0.19
NH_{3}	17.0	105	96	Liquid
N_{2}O	44.0	67	61	Liquid
CO_{2}	44.0	67	61	Liquid

Properties at 0°C and 241 bar (3,500 psi).

== Applications ==
=== Human Propulsion ===
Cold gas thrusters are especially well suited for astronaut propulsion units due to the inert and non-toxic nature of their propellants.

==== Hand-Held Maneuvering Unit ====
Main article: Hand-Held Maneuvering Unit

The Hand-Held Maneuvering Unit (HHMU) used on the Gemini 4 and 10 missions used pressurized oxygen to facilitate the astronauts' extravehicular activities. Although the patent of the HHMU does not categorize the device as a cold gas thruster, the HHMU is described as a "propulsion unit utilizing the thrust developed by a pressurized gas escaping various nozzle means."

==== Manned Maneuvering Unit ====
Twenty-four cold gas thrusters using pressurized gaseous nitrogen were used on the Manned Maneuvering Unit (MMU). The thrusters provided full 6-degree-of-freedom control to the astronaut wearing the MMU. Each thruster provided 1.4 lbf (6.2 N) of thrust. The two propellant tanks onboard provided a total of 40 lb (18 kg) of gaseous nitrogen at 4,500 psi (31 MPa), which provided sufficient propellant to generate a change in velocity of 110 to 135 ft/s (34 to 41 m/s). At a nominal mass, the MMU had a translational acceleration of 0.3 ± 0.05 ft/sec^{2} (9.1 ± 1.5 cm/s^{2}) and a rotational acceleration of 10.0 ± 3.0 deg/sec^{2} (0.1745 ± 0.052 rad/sec^{2})

=== Vernier Engines ===
Larger cold gas thrusters are employed to help in the attitude control of the first stage of the SpaceX Falcon 9 rocket as it returns to land.

=== Automotive ===
In a tweet in June 2018, Elon Musk proposed the use of air-based cold gas thrusters to improve car performance.

In October 2026, Tesla demonstrated a prototype next-generation Tesla Roadster fitted with cold-gas thrusters using compressed air.

In September 2018, Bosch successfully tested its proof-of-concept safety system for righting a slipping motorcycle using cold gas thrusters. The system senses a sideways wheel slip and uses a lateral cold gas thruster to keep the motorcycle from slipping further.

== Research ==
The main focus of research as of 2014 is miniaturization of cold gas thrusters using microelectromechanical systems.

== See also ==
- Resistojet rocket
- Monopropellant Rocket
- CubeSat
