= Resistojet rocket =

Method of spacecraft propulsion

A resistojet is a method of spacecraft propulsion (electric propulsion) that provides thrust by heating a typically non-reactive fluid. Heating is usually achieved by sending electricity through a resistor consisting of a hot incandescent filament, with the expanded gas expelled through a conventional nozzle.

Resistojets have been flown in space since 1965 on board military Vela satellites. However, they only became used in commercial applications in 1980 with the launch of the first satellites in the Intelsat-V program. Many GEO spacecraft, and all 95 Iridium, used Aerojet MR-501/MR-502 series resistojet engines. Nowadays resistojet propulsion is used for orbit insertion, attitude control, and deorbit of LEO satellites, and do well in situations where energy is much less of a constraint than mass, and where propulsion efficiency needs to be reasonably high but low thrust is acceptable.

Resistojets have also been proposed as means of using biowaste as reaction mass, particularly in conjunction with hydrazine. Studies focus on the characteristics of steam and carbon dioxide as major constituents of a biowaste stream, and typically use cubic zirconia as a heating element.

== Advantages ==
Many satellite missions necessitate an ability for minor alterations in trajectory even after the craft has been inserted into orbit. Most satellites use monopropellant rocket motors or cold gas thrusters for such orbital adjustments. Both methods, however, suffer from some limiting drawbacks: Hydrazine, the most commonly used monopropellant, is highly expensive and due to its volatile nature unsuitable for smaller satellites that are sent to space as secondary cargo. Cold gas thrusters, while utilizing relatively cheap, inert and therefore "safe" gasses like nitrogen, suffer from low specific impulse in comparison to monopropellant motors. Resistojets are designed to bridge the gap between these two methods of propulsion, offering the safety of an inert propellant coupled with specific impulse nearing that of hydrazine.

== Disadvantages ==
The main disadvantage of a resistojet design in comparison to simpler cold gas thrusters is the need for a power supply, which takes up space and is therefore sometimes a prohibitive factor for Microsat missions. In addition, the increased technical complexity of a resistojet relative to simpler solutions results in a greater risk of technical failure.

Since they do not take advantage of chemical combustion, resistojets (and similar designs) have a lower thrust that is orders of magnitude lower than those of more conventional solid fuel and liquid-propellant rockets. As a result, they are unsuitable for orbital maneuvers that require high delta-V over shorter periods.

== Physical principles ==
Resistojets can be considered an evolution of traditional cold gas thrusters, which are the simplest form of rocket engine available. Their fuel tank holds the propellant, which is then led into the nozzle where it decompresses, propelling the craft forward. In a resistojet, a resistor is used to heat the fluid before it enters the nozzle, making it expand more forcefully, resulting in higher specific impulse.

A resistor is an electrical component which converts electrical energy into heat. Therefore, the thrust of a resistojet engine can be regulated by simply altering the wattage flowing through the resistor.

Heating a room-temperature (27 °C) fluid by 300 °C in such a way results in a 41% increase in specific impulse. If heated by 900 °C, specific impulse could be doubled in comparison to a cold gas thruster using the same propellant. In other words, a quadrupling of the temperature yields a doubling in specific impulse.

== See also ==
- Solar electric propulsion
- Arcjet rocket thruster
