= Pulsed plasma thruster =

Type of propulsion for spacecraft

A pulsed plasma thruster (PPT) or as a plasma jet engine (PJE), is a form of electric spacecraft propulsion. PPTs are generally considered the simplest form of electric spacecraft propulsion and were the first form of electric propulsion to be flown in space, having flown on two Soviet probes (Zond 2 and Zond 3) starting in 1964. PPTs are generally flown on spacecraft with a surplus of electricity from abundantly available solar energy.

Pulsed Plasma Thrusters (PPT's) are not to be confused with the Pulsed Plasma Rocket (PPR) developed by Howe Industries, as the PPT is an electric propulsion system and the PPR is a nuclear propulsion system which uses a significantly different approach.

== Operation ==
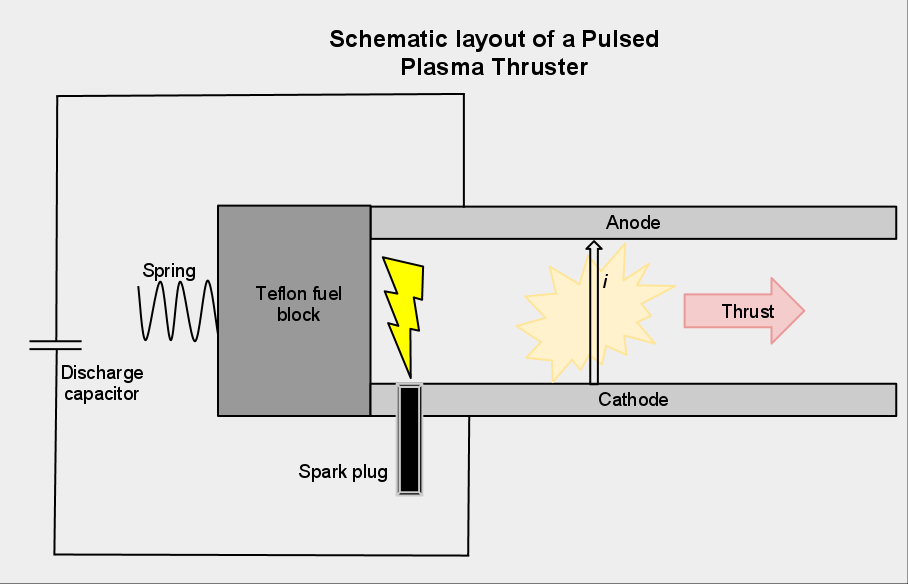
Schematic layout of a Pulsed Plasma Thruster

Most PPTs use a solid material (normally PTFE, more commonly known as Teflon) for propellant, although very few use liquid or gaseous propellants. The first stage in PPT operation involves an arc of electricity passing through the fuel, causing ablation and sublimation of the fuel. The heat generated by this arc causes the resultant gas to turn into plasma, thereby creating a charged gas cloud. Due to the force of the ablation, the plasma is propelled at low speed between two charged plates (an anode and cathode). Since the plasma is charged, the fuel effectively completes the circuit between the two plates, allowing a current to flow through the plasma. This flow of electrons generates a strong electromagnetic field which then exerts a Lorentz force on the plasma, accelerating the plasma out of the PPT exhaust at high velocity. Its mode of operation is similar to a railgun. The pulsing occurs due to the time needed to recharge the plates following each burst of fuel, and the time between each arc. The frequency of pulsing is normally very high and so it generates an almost continuous and smooth thrust. While the thrust is very low, a PPT can operate continuously for extended periods of time, yielding a large final speed.

The energy used in each pulse is stored in a capacitor. By varying the time between each capacitor discharge, the thrust and power draw of the PPT can be varied allowing versatile use of the system.

== Comparison to chemical propulsion ==
The equation for the change in velocity of a spacecraft is given by the rocket equation as follows:

$$\Delta v = v_\text{e} \ln \frac{m_0}{m_1}$$

where:

$\Delta v\$ is delta-v - the maximum change of speed of the vehicle (with no external forces acting),
$v_\text{e}$ is the effective exhaust velocity ($v_\text{e} = I_\text{sp} \cdot g_0$ where $I_\text{sp}$ is the specific impulse expressed as a time period and $g_0$ is standard gravity),
$\ln$ refers to the natural logarithm function,
$m_0$ is the initial total mass, including propellant,
$m_1$ is the final total mass.

PPTs have much higher exhaust velocities than chemical propulsion engines, but have a much smaller fuel flow rate. From the Tsiolkovsky equation stated above, this results in a proportionally higher final velocity of the propelled craft. The exhaust velocity of a PPT is of the order of tens of km/s while conventional chemical propulsion generates thermal velocities in the range of 2–4.5 km/s. Due to this lower thermal velocity, chemical propulsion units become exponentially less effective at higher vehicle velocities, necessitating the use of electric spacecraft propulsion such as PPTs. It is therefore advantageous to use an electric propulsion system such as a PPT to generate high interplanetary speeds in the range 20–70 km/s.

NASA's research PPT (flown in 2000) achieved an exhaust velocity of 13,700 m/s, generated a thrust of 860 μN, and consumed 70 W of electrical power.

A newer PPT variant called the Fiber-fed PPT (FPPT) has been developed by CU Aerospace, L.L.C. on NASA Small Business Innovative Research (SBIR) funds and demonstrated to have an I_{SP} > 3,500 s.

== Advantages and disadvantages ==
PPTs are very robust due to their inherently simple design (relative to other electric spacecraft propulsion techniques). As an electric propulsion system, PPTs benefit from reduced fuel consumption compared to traditional chemical rockets, reducing launch mass and therefore launch costs, as well as high specific impulse improving performance.

However, due to energy losses caused by late time ablation and rapid conductive heat transfer from the propellant to the rest of the spacecraft, propulsive efficiency (kinetic energy of exhaust / total energy used) is very low compared to other forms of electric propulsion, at around just 10%.

== Uses ==
PPTs are well-suited to uses on relatively small spacecraft with a mass of less than 100 kg (particularly CubeSats) for roles such as attitude control, station keeping, de-orbiting manoeuvres and deep space exploration. Using PPTs could double the life-span of these small satellite missions without significantly increasing complexity or cost due to the inherent simplicity and relatively low cost nature of PPTs.

The first use of PPTs was on the Soviet Zond 2 space probe which carried six PPTs that served as actuators of the attitude control system. The PPT propulsion system was tested for 70 minutes on the 14 December 1964 when the spacecraft was 4.2 million kilometers from Earth.

A PPT was flown by NASA in November, 2000, as a flight experiment on the Earth Observing-1 spacecraft. The thrusters successfully demonstrated the ability to perform roll control on the spacecraft and demonstrated that the electromagnetic interference from the pulsed plasma did not affect other spacecraft systems. Pulsed plasma thrusters are also an avenue of research used by universities for starting experiments with electric propulsion due to the relative simplicity and lower costs involved with PPTs as opposed to other forms of electric propulsion such as Hall-effect ion thrusters.

== Ongoing NASA research ==
On July 11, 2024 Howe Industries announced that it had contracted with NASA via a $725,000.00 grant to continue research on PPR propulsion technology. Howe Industries claimed that should PPR propulsion technology succeed in becoming a fully functional means of propelling space ships to Mars, then PPR technology should be capable of shortening travel time to Mars, down from the current requirement of approximately 1 year, to a much shorter travel time of only 2 months. Howe Industries further stated that at the current rate of their PPR research and development program, the technology may not be fully ready to propel a crewed space ship to Mars for approximately another 20 years (as of 2024).

An FPPT flight unit was qualified and integrated into CU Aerospace’s NASA-funded Dual Propulsion Experiment (“DUPLEX”) 6U CubeSat. The DUPLEX satellite was launched on the Space X Northrup Grumman CRS-23 Mission on September 14, 2025 and successfully docked with the International Space Station September 18, 2025. Subsequent in-space demonstration of the CU Aerospace FPPT-Fiber-fed Pulsed Plasma Thruster and MVP-Monofilament Vaporization Propulsion Thruster technologies is scheduled for early November 2025.

== See also ==
- Vacuum arc thruster
- Rocket propulsion technologies (disambiguation)
