= Orders of magnitude (force) =

Comparison of a wide range of physical forces

Examples of force.

The following list shows different orders of magnitude of force.

Since weight under gravity is a force, several of these examples refer to the weight of various objects. Unless otherwise stated, these are weights under average Earth gravity at sea level.

== Below 1 N ==
Factor (N)	Value	Item
10^{−47}	3.6×10^{−17} qN	Gravitational attraction of the proton and the electron in hydrogen atom
10^{−30} quectonewton (qN)	8.9 qN	Weight of an electron
10^{−26}	16 rN	Weight of a hydrogen atom
10^{−24} yoctonewton (yN)	5 yN	Force necessary to synchronize the motion of a single trapped ion with an external signal measured in a 2010 experiment
10^{−22}	170 yN	Force measured in a 2010 experiment by perturbing 60 beryllium-9 ions
10^{−18} attonewton (aN)		
10^{−17}	30 aN	Smallest force of gravity measured
10^{−15} femtonewton (fN)		
10^{−14}	~10 fN	Brownian motion force on an E. coli bacterium averaged over 1 second
10^{−14}	~10 fN	Weight of an E. coli bacterium
10^{−13}	~100 fN	Force to stretch double-stranded DNA to 50% relative extension
10^{−12} piconewton (pN)	~4 pN	Force to break a hydrogen bond
10^{−12} piconewton (pN)	~5 pN	Maximum force of a molecular motor
10^{−11}		
10^{−10}	~160 pN	Force to break a typical noncovalent bond
10^{−9} nanonewton (nN)	~1.6 nN	Force to break a typical covalent bond
10^{−8}	~82 nN	Force on an electron in a hydrogen atom
10^{−7}	~200 nN	Force between two 1 meter long conductors, 1 meter apart by an outdated definition of one ampere
10^{−6} micronewton (μN)	1–150 μN	Output of FEEP ion thrusters used in NASA's Laser Interferometer Space Antenna
10^{−4}		
10^{−3} millinewton (mN)	2-4 mN	EQUULEUS § Propulsion
10^{−2}	19-92 mN	Thrust of the NSTAR ion engine tested on NASA's space probe Deep Space 1
10^{−1}		

== 1 N and above ==
Magnitude	Value	Item
1 N	1.4 N	The weight of a smartphone
1 N	2.5 N	Typical thrust of a Dual-Stage 4-Grid ion thruster.
1 N	9.8 N	One kilogram-force, nominal weight of a 1 kg (2.2 lb) object at sea level on Earth
10 N	50 N	Average force to break the shell of a chicken egg from a young hen
10^{2} N	720 N	Average force of human bite, measured at molars
10^{3} N kilonewton (kN)	5 kN	The force applied by the engine of a small car during peak acceleration
10^{3} N kilonewton (kN)	8 kN	The maximum force achieved by weight lifters during a 'clean and jerk' lift (During the clean part)
10^{3} N kilonewton (kN)	9 kN	The bite force of one adult American alligator
10^{4} N	16.5 kN	The bite force of a 5.2 m (17 ft) saltwater crocodile
10^{4} N	18 kN	The estimated bite force of a 6.1 m (20 ft) adult great white shark
10^{4} N	25 kN	Approximate force applied by the motors of a Tesla Model S during maximal acceleration
10^{4} N	25.5 to 34.5 kN	The estimated bite force of a large 6.7 m (22 ft) adult saltwater crocodile
10^{5} N	100 kN	The average force applied by seatbelt and airbag to a restrained passenger in a car which hits a stationary barrier at 100 km/h
10^{5} N	569 kN	Maximum thrust of a large turbofan engine (General Electric GE90)
10^{5} N	890 kN	Maximum pulling force (tractive effort) of a single large diesel-electric locomotive
10^{6} N meganewton (MN)	1.8 MN	Thrust of Space Shuttle Main Engine at lift-off
10^{6} N meganewton (MN)	1.9 MN	Weight of the largest blue whale
10^{7} N	35 MN	Thrust of Saturn V rocket at lift-off
10^{8} N	570 MN	Simplistic estimate of force of sunlight on Earth
10^{9} N giganewton (GN)	8.99 GN	Force between two charges of 1 coulomb placed 1 meter apart
10^{20} N	200 EN	Gravitational attraction between Earth and Moon
10^{22} N	35 ZN	Gravitational attraction between Earth and Sun
10^{29} N	~810 RN	Gravitational attraction between our galaxy and Andromeda Galaxy
10^{44} N	1.2×10^{14} QN	Planck force
