= Gridded ion thruster =

Space propulsion system

The gridded ion thruster is a common design for ion thrusters, a highly efficient low-thrust spacecraft propulsion method running on electrical power by using high-voltage grid electrodes to accelerate ions with electrostatic forces.

== History ==
The ion engine was first demonstrated by German-born NASA scientist Ernst Stuhlinger, and developed in practical form by Harold R. Kaufman at NASA Lewis (now Glenn) Research Center from 1957 to the early 1960s.

The use of ion propulsion systems were first demonstrated in space by the NASA Lewis Space Electric Rocket Test (SERT) I and II. These thrusters used mercury as the reaction mass. The first was SERT-1, launched July 20, 1964, which successfully proved that the technology operated as predicted in space. The second test, SERT-II, launched on February 3, 1970, verified the operation of two mercury ion engines for thousands of running hours. Despite the demonstration in the 1960s and 70s, though, they were rarely used before the late 1990s.

NASA Glenn continued to develop electrostatic gridded ion thrusters through the 1980s, developing the NASA Solar Technology Application Readiness (NSTAR) engine, that was used successfully on the Deep Space 1 probe, the first mission to fly an interplanetary trajectory using electric propulsion as the primary propulsion. It later flew on the Dawn asteroid mission.

Hughes Aircraft Company (now L-3 ETI) has developed the XIPS (Xenon Ion Propulsion System) for performing station keeping on its geosynchronous satellites (more than 100 engines flying). NASA is currently working on a 20–50 kW electrostatic ion thruster called HiPEP which will have higher efficiency, specific impulse, and a longer lifetime than NSTAR.

In 2006, Aerojet completed testing of a prototype NEXT ion thruster.

Beginning in the 1970s, radio-frequency ion thrusters were developed at Giessen University and ArianeGroup. RIT-10 engines are flying on the EURECA and ARTEMIS. Qinetiq (UK) has developed the T5 and T6 engines (Kaufman type), used on the GOCE mission (T5) and the BepiColombo mission (T6). From Japan, the μ10, using microwaves, flew on the Hayabusa mission.

In 2021, DART launched carrying a NEXT-C xenon ion thruster.

In 2021, ThrustMe reported satellite orbit changes using their NPT30-I2 iodine ion thruster.

== Method of operation ==
Propellant atoms are injected into the discharge chamber and are ionized, forming a plasma.

There are several ways of producing the electrostatic ions for the discharge chamber:

- electron bombardment (Kaufman type) by a potential difference between a hollow cathode and anode (NSTAR, NEXT, T5, T6 thrusters)
- radio frequency (RF) oscillation of an electric field induced by an alternating electromagnet, which results in a self-sustaining discharge and omits any cathode (RIT 10, RIT 22, μN-RIT thrusters)
- microwave heating (μ10, μ20)

Related to the electrostatic ion production method is the need for a cathode and power supply requirements. Electron bombardment thrusters require at the least, power supplies to the cathode, anode and chamber. RF and microwave types require an additional power supply to the rf generator, but no anode or cathode power supplies.

The positively charged ions diffuse towards the chamber's extraction system (2 or more multi-aperture grids). After ions enter the plasma sheath at a grid hole, they are accelerated by the potential difference between the first and second grids (called the screen and accelerator grids, respectively). The ions are guided through the extraction holes by the powerful electric field. The final ion energy is determined by the potential of the plasma, which generally is slightly greater than the screen grids' voltage.

The negative voltage of the accelerator grid prevents electrons of the beam plasma outside the thruster from streaming back to the discharge plasma. This can fail due to insufficient negative potential in the grid, which is a common ending for ion thrusters' operational life. The expelled ions propel the spacecraft in the opposite direction, according to Newton's 3rd law. Lower-energy electrons are emitted from a separate cathode, called the neutralizer, into the ion beam to ensure that equal amounts of positive and negative charge are ejected. Neutralizing is needed to prevent the spacecraft from gaining a net negative charge, which would attract ions back toward the spacecraft and cancel the thrust.

== Performance ==
=== Longevity ===
The ion optics are constantly bombarded by a small amount of secondary ions and erode or wear away, thus reducing engine efficiency and life. Several techniques were used to reduce erosion; most notable was switching to a different propellant. Mercury or caesium atoms were used as propellants during tests in the 1960s and 1970s, but these propellants adhered to, and eroded the grids. Xenon atoms, on the other hand, are far less corrosive, and became the propellant of choice for virtually all ion thruster types. NASA has demonstrated continuous operation of NSTAR thruster for over 16,000 hours (1.8 years) and NEXT thruster for over 48,000 hours (5.5 years).

In the extraction grid systems, minor differences occur in the grid geometry and the materials used. This may have implications for the grid system operational lifetime.

=== Specific impulse ===
Electrostatic ion thrusters have also achieved a specific impulse of 30–100 kN·s/kg, or 3,000 to 10,000 s, better than most other ion thruster types. Electrostatic ion thrusters have accelerated ions to speeds reaching 100 km/s.

=== Benefits of four grids ===
In January 2006, the European Space Agency, together with the Australian National University, announced successful testing of an improved electrostatic ion engine, the Dual-Stage 4-Grid (DS4G), that showed exhaust speeds of 210 km/s, reportedly four times higher than previously achieved, allowing for a specific impulse which is four times higher. Conventional electrostatic ion thrusters possess only two grids, one high voltage and one low voltage, which perform both the ion extraction and acceleration functions. However, when the charge differential between these grids reaches around 5 kV, some of the particles extracted from the chamber collide with the low voltage grid, eroding it and compromising the engine's longevity. This limitation is successfully bypassed when two pairs of grids are used. The first pair operates at high voltage, possessing a voltage differential of around 3 kV between them; this grid pair is responsible for extracting the charged propellant particles from the gas chamber. The second pair, operating at low voltage, provides the electrical field that accelerates the particles outwards, creating thrust. Other advantages to the new engine include a more compact design, allowing it to be scaled up to higher thrusts, and a narrower, less divergent exhaust plume of 3 degrees, which is reportedly five times narrower than previously achieved. This reduces the propellant needed to correct the orientation of the spacecraft due to small uncertainties in the thrust vector direction.

== See also ==
- Electrically powered spacecraft propulsion
  - Hall-effect thruster
- Ion thruster, has comparison table with HET etc
  - Dual-Stage 4-Grid
