= Solar electric propulsion =

High efficiency engine for space travel

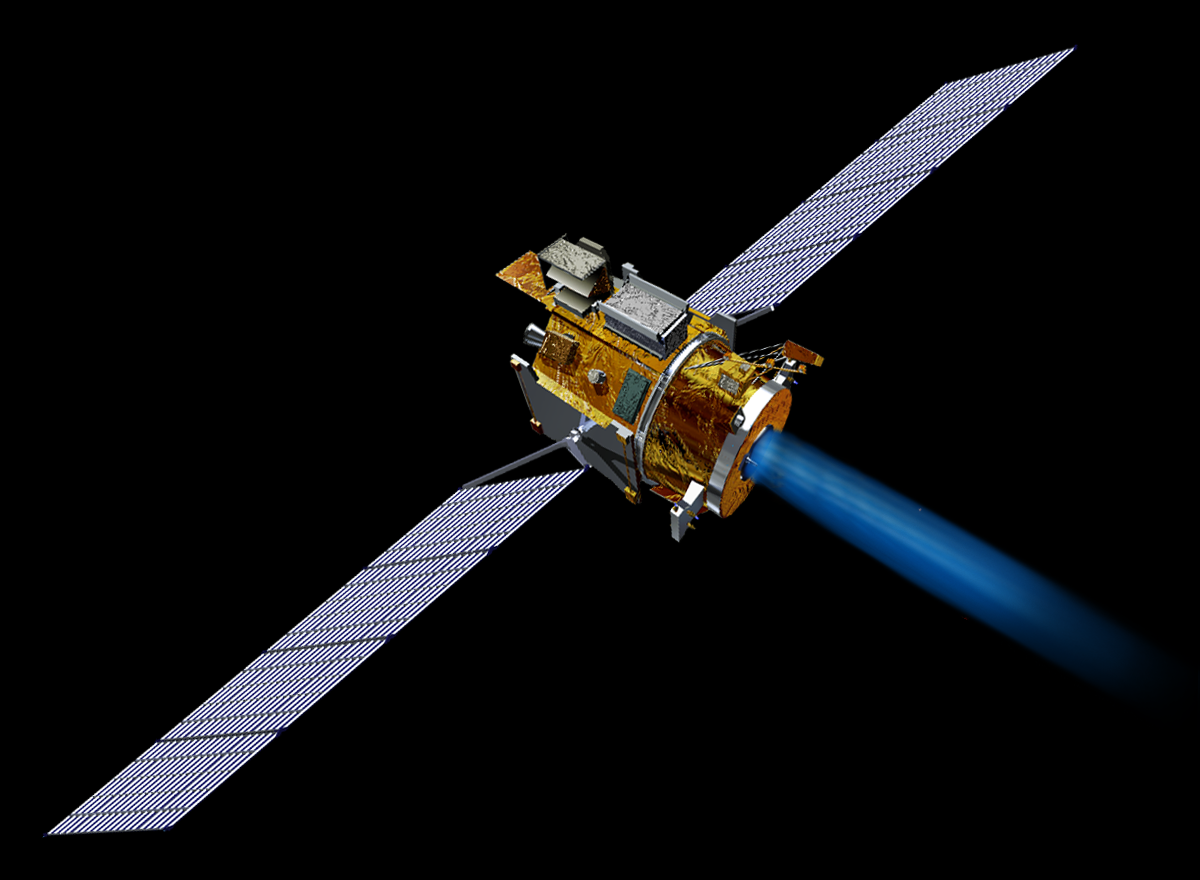
Artistic view of Deep Space 1, showing both the solar panels and ion engine (with blue exhaust), major aspects of this solar electric design. Solar energy may also be temporarily stored in chemical batteries inside the spacecraft bus.

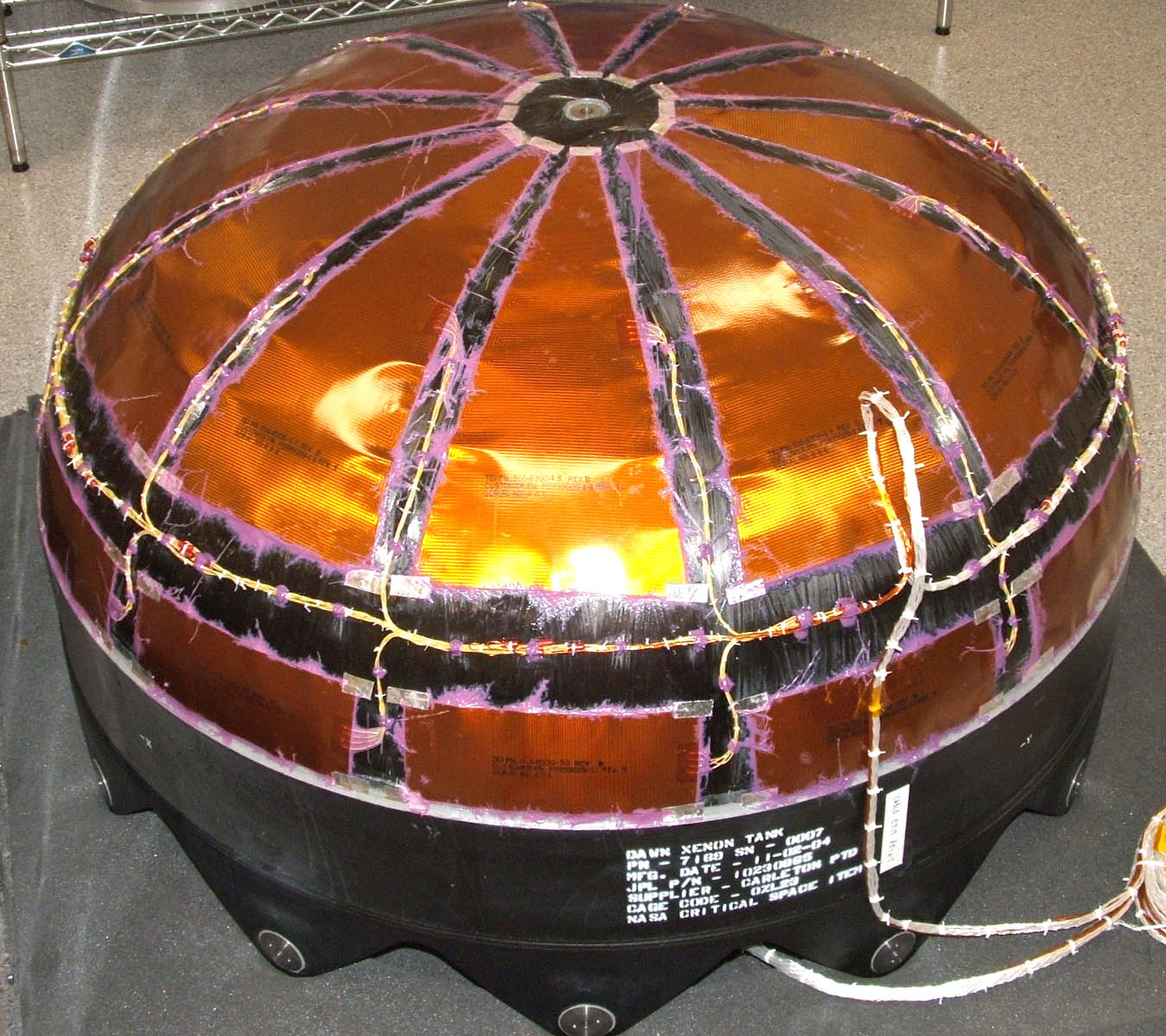
The Dawn spacecraft's xenon tank prior to integration with spacecraft. The xenon was the propellant for the solar-power ion drive of the spacecraft which would go on to orbit two different asteroids in the early 21st century.

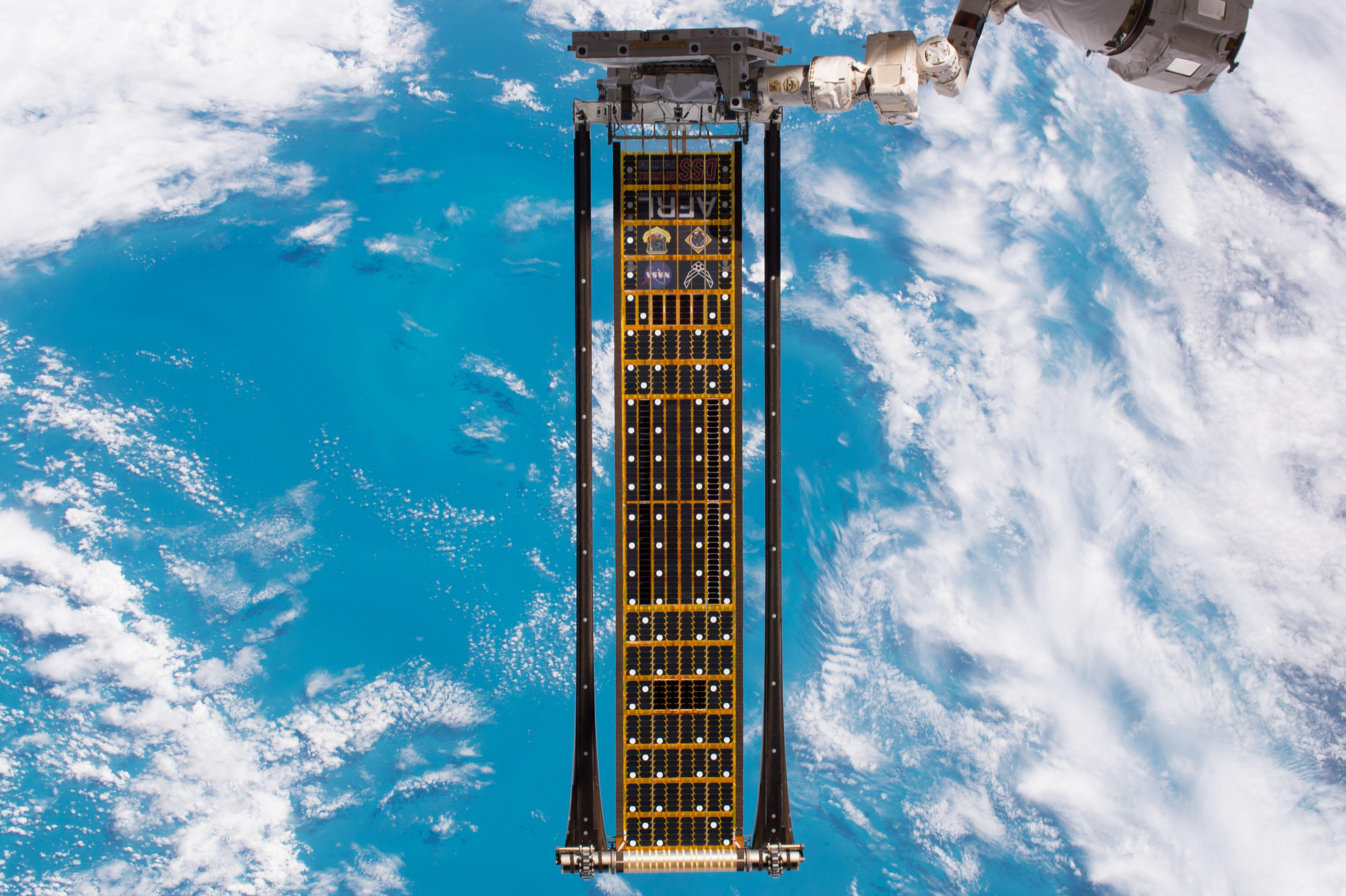
Roll-out solar panel tested in Earth Orbit at the International Space Station (ISS), 2017.

Solar electric propulsion (SEP) is the combination of solar cells and electric thrusters to propel a spacecraft through outer space. This technology has been exploited in a variety of spacecraft designs by the European Space Agency (ESA), the JAXA (Japanese Space Agency), Indian Space Research Organisation (ISRO) and NASA. SEP has a significantly higher specific impulse than chemical rocket propulsion, thus requiring less propellant mass to be launched with a spacecraft. The technology has been evaluated for missions to Mars.

== Overview ==
Solar electric propulsion combines solar panels on spacecraft and one or more electric thrusters, used in tandem. There are many different types of electric thrusters, including a so-called ion thruster, a term that is often incorrectly used to describe all types of electric thrusters.

It is also possible to generate electricity from the Sun without using photovoltaic panels, such as with solar concentrators and a Stirling engine.

A 50 kilowatt SEP system was studied in the 2010s for a mission to an asteroid. In February 2012, NASA awarded a contract for a Solar Electric Propulsion Flight System.

An example of work on this type of technology is Advanced Electric Propulsion System.

The NASA Solar Technology Application Readiness (NSTAR) ion engine has been used with photovoltaic solar panels, which was tested on the Deep Space 1 mission along with Solar Concentrator Arrays (Launched in 1998 as part of the New Millennium Program).

SEP has been studied as a technology for a mission to Mars. In particular the high specific impulse of the ion engines could lower overall mass and avoid having to use nuclear technology for power when coupled with solar panels. A 1998 study for SEP for a human mission suggest that a human-sized spacecraft would need 600 to 800 kilowatts of electrical power coupled with ion engines with a specific impulse of 2000 to 2500 seconds.

== Mission examples ==
- BepiColombo mission to Mercury (launched)
- Dawn to asteroids Vesta and Ceres (completed)
- Deep Space 1 to asteroid Braille and comet Borrelly (completed)
- GSAT-9 communication (launched)
- Hayabusa to asteroid Itokawa (completed)
- Hayabusa2 to asteroid Ryugu (primary mission completed, extended mission ongoing)
- LightShip space tug for Mars exploration (under development)
- Lunar Gateway space station orbiting the Moon (under construction)
- Psyche to asteroid Psyche (launched)
- GSAT-20 (launched)
- Starlink low-earth-orbit internet (thousands of satellites in service)

== Electric propulsion technologies ==
- Resistojet rocket
- Ion thruster
  - High Power Electric Propulsion
- Pulsed plasma thruster
- Hall-effect thruster
- Magnetoplasmadynamic thruster
- Microwave electrothermal thruster
- Field-emission electric propulsion
- Variable Specific Impulse Magnetoplasma Rocket (VASIMR)

== See also ==
- Batteries in space
- Liquid-propellant rocket
- List of spacecraft with electric propulsion
- Nuclear electric rocket
- Solar sail
- Solar thermal rocket
