= Nuclear electric rocket =

Type of spacecraft propulsion system

A nuclear electric rocket (more properly nuclear electric propulsion) is a type of spacecraft propulsion system where thermal energy from a nuclear reactor is converted to electrical energy, which is used to drive an ion thruster or other electrical spacecraft propulsion technology. The nuclear electric rocket terminology is slightly inconsistent, as technically the "rocket" part of the propulsion system is non-nuclear and could also be driven by solar panels. This is in contrast with a nuclear thermal rocket, which directly uses reactor heat to add energy to a working fluid, which is then expelled out of a rocket nozzle.

== Conceptual overview ==
The key elements to NEP are:

1. A compact reactor core
2. An electric generator
3. A compact waste heat rejection system such as heat pipes
4. An electric power conditioning and distribution system
5. Electrically powered spacecraft propulsion

== History ==
=== United States ===
SNAP-10A, launched into orbit by USAF in 1965, was the first use of a nuclear reactor in space and of an ion thruster in orbit.

A 1963 paper by Myron Levoy proposed a hybrid nuclear-electric engine design, which would have been able to work both in open-cycle mode as a nuclear thermal engine during mission phases requiring high thrust, as well as in closed-cycle mode as a nuclear-electric engine with low thrust, but high efficiency during remaining mission phases. The proposed application of this engine design was for a fast human-crewed round-trip mission to Mars.

In 2001, the Safe affordable fission engine was under development, with a tested 30 kW nuclear heat source intended to lead to the development of a 400 kW thermal reactor with Brayton cycle gas turbines to produce electric power. Waste heat rejection was intended to be accomplished using low-mass heat pipe technology. Safety was intended to be assured by a rugged design.

Project Prometheus was an early 2000s NASA study on nuclear electric spacecraft.

Kilopower was a NASA reactor development program, but did not received an operational follow-up mission.

In March 2026, it was announced that NASA would use a nuclear electric rocket, Space Reactor‑1 Freedom, to transport the Skyfall mission to Mars. This would be the first usage of a nuclear-powered interplanetary propulsion system, with the Advanced Electric Propulsion System now serving as such. The mission will deploy multiple helicopters to the surface of Mars.

=== European Union ===
The European Space Agency studied Rocketroll nuclear electric spacecraft for Mars missions.

=== Soviet Union and Russia ===
US-A satellite series, launched by into orbit by the USSR, included Kosmos 1818 and Kosmos 1867 in 1987, using the TOPAZ nuclear reactor and a "Plazma-2 SPT" Hall-effect thruster.

The TEM project started in 2009 with the goal of powering a Mars engine.

March 2016 - First batch of nuclear fuel received

== Concepts ==
=== Pebble bed reactor combined with gas turbine ===
A pebble bed reactor using high mass-flow gaseous nitrogen coolant near normal atmospheric pressures is a possible heat source. Power generation could be accomplished with gas turbine technology, which is well developed. Nuclear fuel would be highly enriched uranium encapsulated in low-boron graphite balls probably 5–10 cm in diameter. The graphite would also moderate the neutrons of the nuclear reaction.

This style of reactor can be designed to be inherently safe. As it heats, the graphite expands, separating the fuel and reducing the reactor's criticality. This property can simplify the operating controls to a single valve throttling the turbine. When closed, the reactor heats, but produces less power. When open, the reactor cools, but becomes more critical and produces more power.

The graphite encapsulation simplifies refueling and waste handling. Graphite is mechanically strong, and resists high temperatures. This reduces the risk of an unplanned release of radioactive elements, including fission products. Since this style of reactor produces high power without heavy castings to contain high pressures, it is well suited to power spacecraft.

=== Novel electric propulsion concepts ===
A variety of electric propulsion technologies have been proposed for use with high power nuclear electrical generation systems, including VASIMR, DS4G, and pulsed inductive thruster (PIT). PIT and VASIMR are unique in their ability to trade between power usage, specific impulse (a measure of efficiency, see specific impulse) and thrust in-flight. PIT has the additional advantage of not needing conditioned power.

=== Electrical generation ===
A number of heat-to-electricity schemes have been proposed. In the near term, Rankine cycle, Brayton cycle, and Stirling cycle generators go through an intermediate mechanical phase, with attendant energy losses. More exotic technologies have also been proposed: thermoelectric (including graphene-based thermal power conversion), pyroelectric, thermophotovoltaic, thermionic and magnetohydrodynamic type thermoelectric materials.

== Other types of nuclear power concepts in space ==
Radioisotope thermoelectric generators, radioisotope heater units, radioisotope piezoelectric generators, and the radioisotope rocket all use the heat from a static radioactive source (usually Plutonium-238) for a low level of electric or direct propulsion power. Other concepts include the nuclear thermal rocket, the fission fragment rocket, nuclear pulse propulsion, and the possibility of a fusion rocket, assuming that nuclear fusion technology is developed at some point in the near future.

== See also ==
- Electrically powered spacecraft propulsion
- Ion thruster
- Magnetic sail
- Nuclear pulse propulsion
- Nuclear thermal rocket
- Nuclear reactor
- Polywell
- Radioisotope thermoelectric generator
- Spacecraft propulsion
- Rocket propulsion technologies (disambiguation)
