= NEXT (ion thruster) =

Space propulsion system, a gridded electrostatic ion thruster

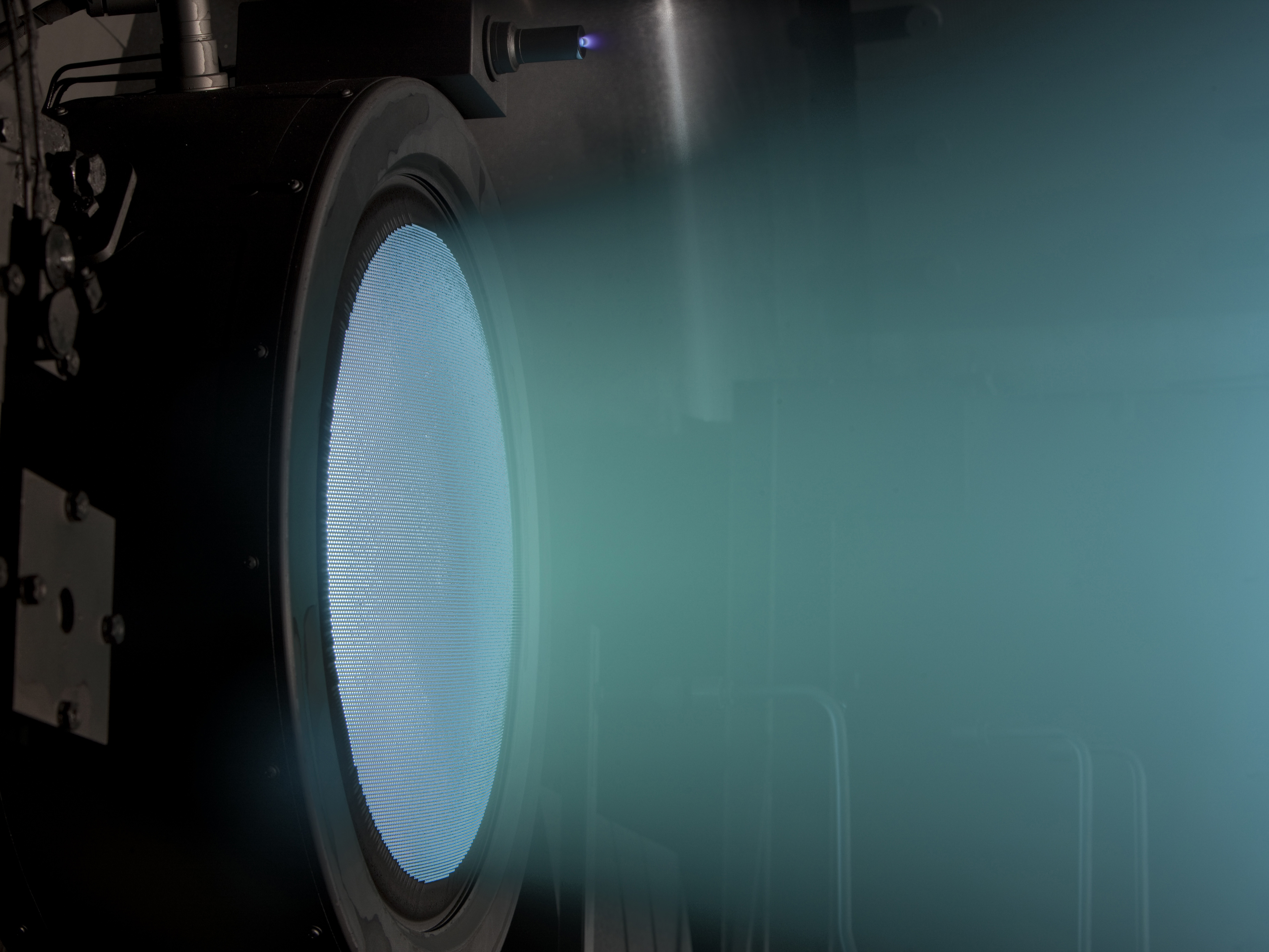
Image of NASA's Evolutionary Xenon Thruster (NEXT) operation in vacuum chamber

The NASA Evolutionary Xenon Thruster (NEXT) project at Glenn Research Center is a gridded electrostatic ion thruster about three times as powerful as the NSTAR used on Dawn and Deep Space 1 spacecraft. It was used in DART, launched in 2021.

Glenn Research Center manufactured the test engine's core ionization chamber, and Aerojet Rocketdyne designed and built the ion acceleration assembly.

== Purpose ==
NEXT affords larger delivered payloads, smaller launch vehicle size, and other mission enhancements compared to chemical and other electric propulsion technologies for Discovery, New Frontiers, Mars Exploration, and Flagship outer-planet exploration missions.

== Design ==
The NEXT engine is a type of solar electric propulsion in which thruster systems use the electricity generated by the spacecraft's solar panel to accelerate the xenon propellant to speeds of up to 90,000 mph (145,000 km/h or 40 km/s). NEXT can consume 6.9 kW power to produce 237 mN thrust, with a specific impulse of 4,170 seconds (compared to 3120 for NSTAR), and has been run for over five years. It can be throttled down to 0.5 kW power, when it has a specific impulse of 1320 seconds.

The NEXT thruster has demonstrated, in ground tests, a total impulse of 17 MN·s, which as of 2010 was the highest total impulse ever demonstrated by an ion thruster. A beam extraction area 1.6 times that of NSTAR allows higher thruster input power while maintaining low voltages and ion current densities, thus maintaining thruster longevity.

In November 2010, it was revealed that the prototype had completed a 48,000 hours (5.5 years) test in December 2009. Thruster performance characteristics, measured over the entire throttle range of the thruster, were within predictions and the engine showed little sign of degradation and is ready for mission opportunities.

== Development ==
NEXT completed its System Requirement Review in July 2015 and Preliminary Design Review in February 2016. The first two flight units will be available in early 2019. After 2019, it will be a commercial product for purchase by NASA and non-NASA customers. Aerojet Rocketdyne, and their major sub-contractor ZIN Technologies retain the rights to produce the system, known as NEXT-C for future commercialization.

In 2018, the CAESAR mission concept to comet 67P/Churyumov–Gerasimenko was a finalist for the New Frontiers program mission #4, and if selected, it would have been propelled by the NEXT ion engine. However, on 27 June 2019, the other finalist, the Dragonfly mission, was chosen instead.

Later in 2019, NEXT-C was selected for the DART mission and was successfully delivered to APL in the summer of 2020.

== Use in space ==
Launched in November 2021, for the first time in space, the Double Asteroid Redirection Test (DART) spacecraft used the NEXT-C ion thruster powered by 22 m^{2} of solar arrays generating ~3.5 kW.

== See also ==
- Electrically powered spacecraft propulsion
  - Hall effect thruster, a different type of ion thruster
  - Advanced Electric Propulsion System – Spacecraft propulsion system by NASA. 50kW Hall-effect thrusters, now for Lunar Gateway
  - Nuclear electric rocket
