= SPT-100 =

Hall-effect ion thruster

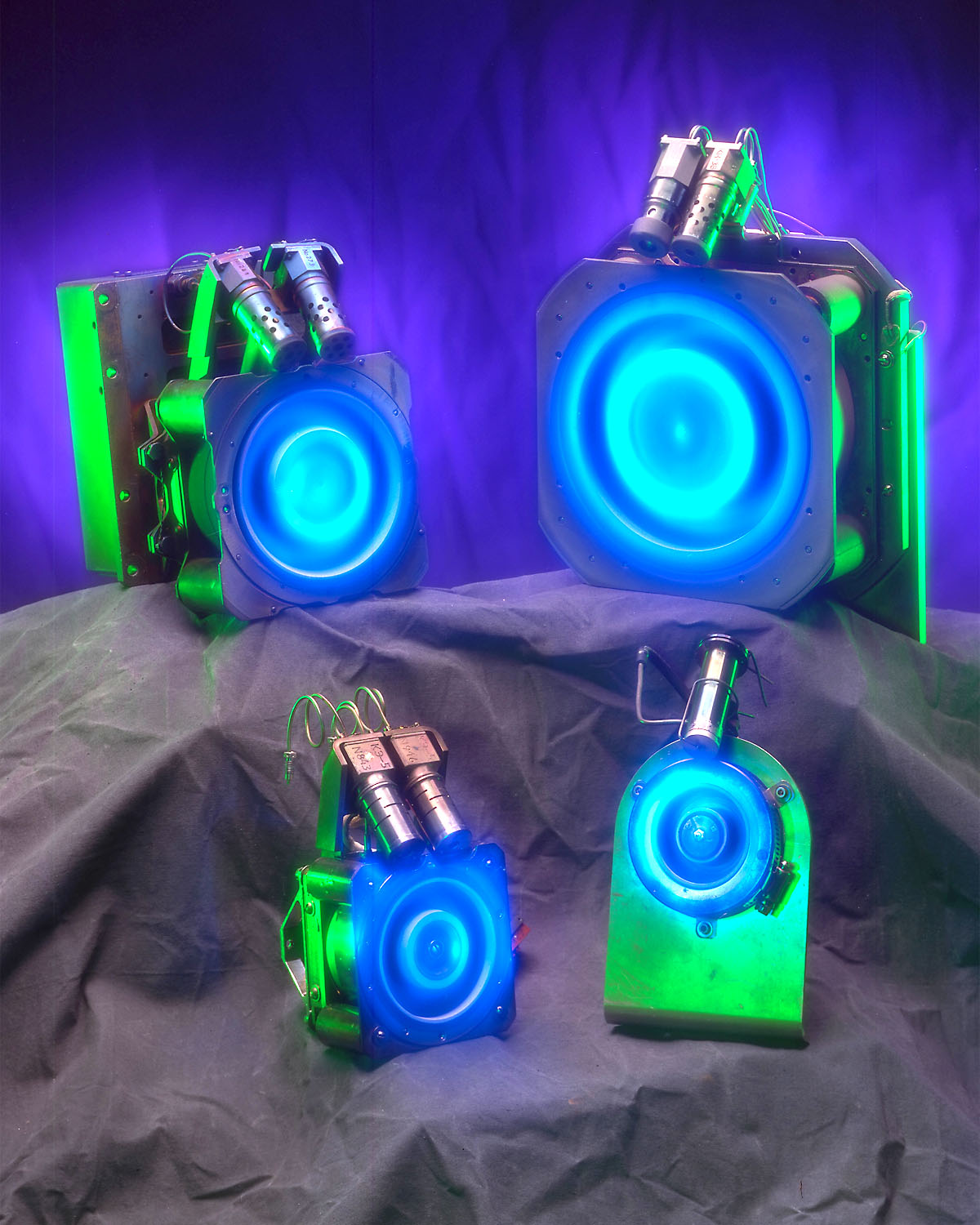
SPT-series thrusters. Upper-left one is SPT-100.

SPT-100 is a Hall-effect ion thruster, part of the SPT-family of thrusters. SPT stands for Stationary Plasma Thruster. It creates a stream of electrically charged xenon ions accelerated by an electric field and confined by a magnetic field.

The thruster is manufactured by Russian OKB Fakel, and was first launched onboard the Gals-1 satellite in 1994. In 2003, Fakel debuted a second generation of the thruster, called SPT-100B, and in 2011, it presented further upgrades in SPT-100M prototypes. As of 2011, SPT-100 thrusters were used in 18 Russian and 14 foreign spacecraft, including IPSTAR-II, Telstar-8, and Ekspress A and AM constellations.

== Specifications ==
Parameter	SPT-100	SPT-100B	SPT-100M	SPT-100D
Power (W)	1350	1350	1350	2500
Thrust (mN)	80	83	90.2	112
Thrust-to-power level (mN/kW)	59.26	61.48	66.81	44.80
Specific impulse (s)	1,600	1,600	1,734	2,200
Efficiency (%)	47	48	57	48
Voltage (V)	300	300	300	600
Discharge current (A)	4.5	4.5	4.5	4.17
Mass (kg)	4			4.7

== See also ==
- PPS-1350
- SPT-140
