= SPT-140 =

Russian-made Hall effect xenon ion spacecraft thruster

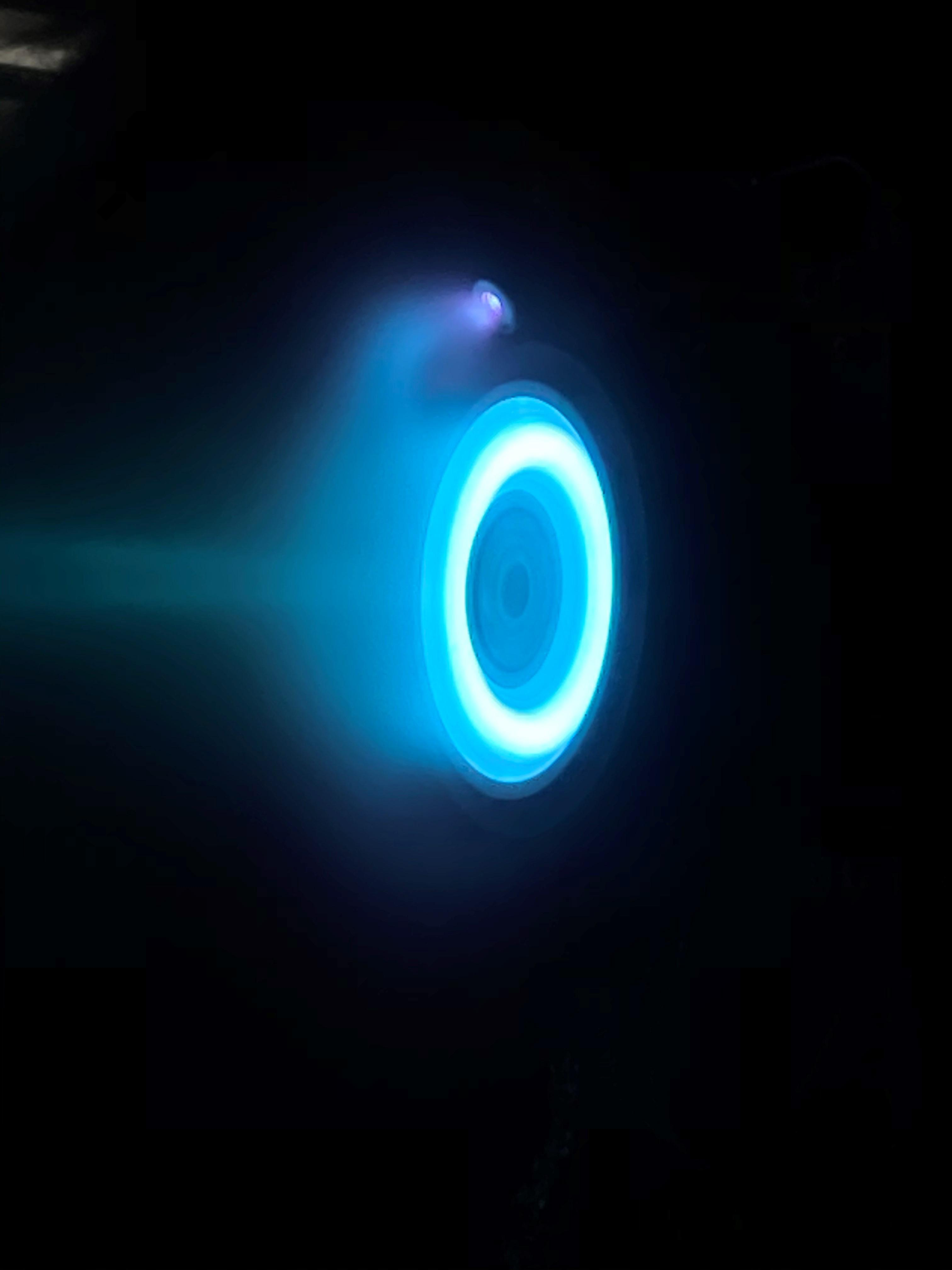
Test-firing of the Psyche spacecraft's SPT-140 at the Jet Propulsion Laboratory.

SPT-140 is a solar-powered Hall-effect ion thruster, part of the SPT-family of thrusters. SPT stands for Stationary Plasma Thruster. Like other members of the SPT series, it creates a stream of electrically charged xenon ions accelerated by an electric field and confined by a magnetic field.

The thruster is manufactured by the Russian OKB Fakel, who collaborated during development with NASA's Glenn Research Center, Space Systems Loral, and Pratt & Whitney beginning in the late 1980s. It was first tested at the Plasmadynamics and Electric Propulsion Laboratory in 1997. In 2002, it was tested as a 3.5 kW unit by the United States Air Force as part of its Integrated High Payoff Rocket Propulsion Technology program. In 2023, the thruster was launched aboard NASA's Psyche spacecraft.

== Specifications ==
SPT-140	Parameter/units
Type	Hall-effect thruster
Power	Max: 4.5 kW; Min: 900 watts
Specific impulse (I_{sp})	1800 seconds
Thrust	280 mN
Thruster mass	8.5 kg

== See also ==
- PPS-1350
- SPT-100
