= NSTAR =

NSTAR may refer to:

- NASA Solar Technology Application Readiness (NSTAR), a type of spacecraft ion thruster.
- NSTAR (company), a Boston utility company for electricity and natural gas.
