= Harold R. Kaufman =

American physicist

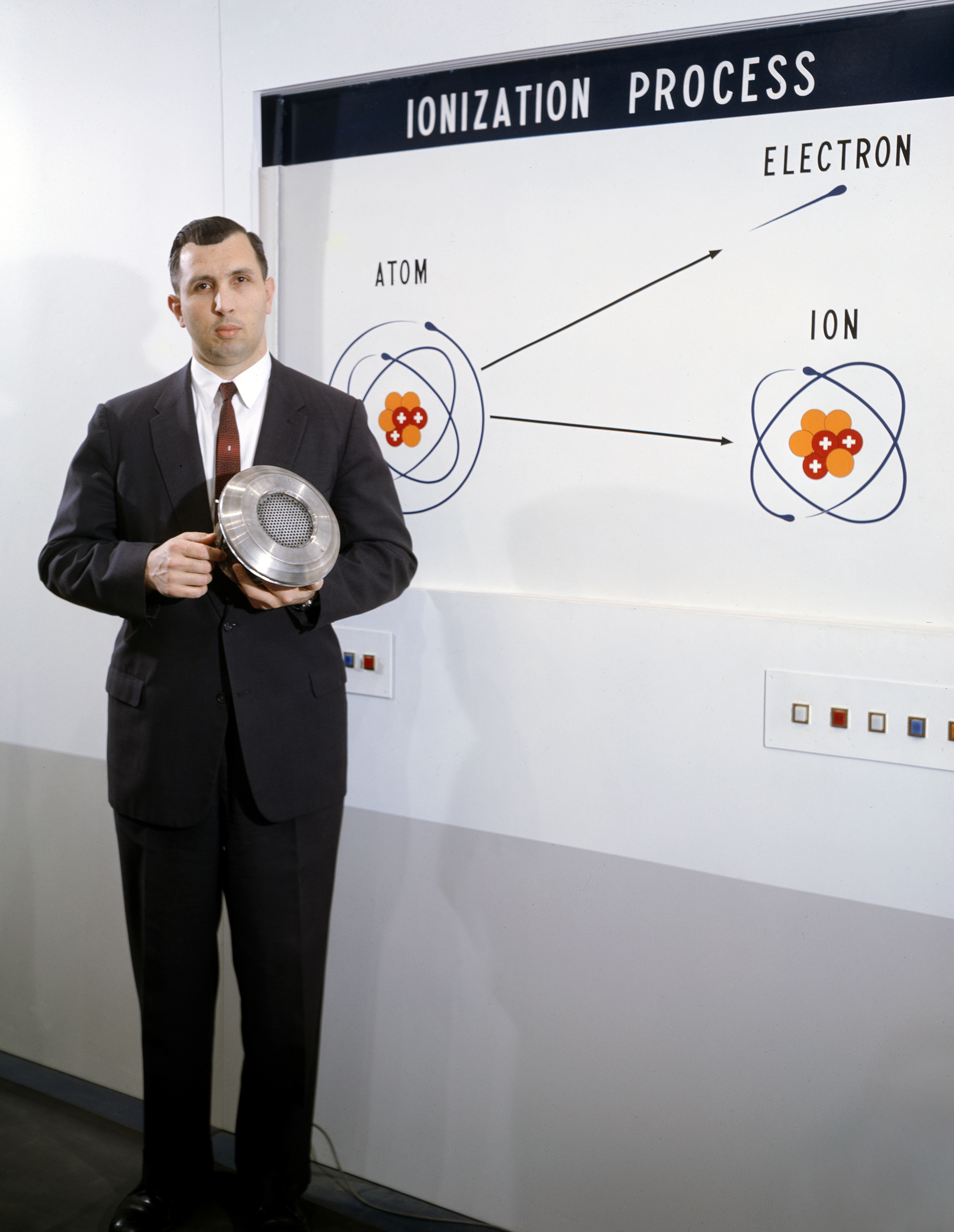
Harold Kaufman holding his electron bombardment thruster.

Harold R. Kaufman (November 24, 1926 – January 4, 2018) was an American physicist, noted for his development of electrostatic ion thrusters for NASA during the 1950s and 1960s. Kaufman developed a compact ion source based on electron bombardment, the "Kaufman Ion Source," a variant of the duoplasmatron, for the purpose of spacecraft propulsion.

== Biography ==
Born in Audubon, Iowa, USA, in 1926, Kaufman grew up in Evanston, Illinois, a suburb of Chicago. He trained in electrical engineering during World War II through an electronic technician program in the US Navy. After the war ended, he took a B.S. degree in mechanical engineering from Northwestern University. After college he joined the National Advisory Committee for Aeronautics (NACA), the predecessor of NASA, working on turbo jet engines at the Lewis Research Center (now NASA Glenn) in Cleveland.

He then moved to a group studying electric space propulsion. After concluding that a Von Ardenne source was insufficient, he developed the electron bombardment source in 1958/1959, and was responsible for the development of two ion thrusters that were tested in space (SERT-1 and SERT-II missions). The Kaufman ion source is now also used for other applications, such as ion implanters used in semiconductor processing.

Kaufman was awarded a Ph.D. from Colorado State University (CSU) in 1970, and an Exceptional Scientific Achievement Award by NASA in 1971. He joined CSU as staff in 1974, then left academia in 1984 to work at Kaufman & Robinson, Inc., in Fort Collins, Colorado. He invented the end-Hall ion source in 1989.

In 1991, the AVS awarded him its Albert Nerkin Award. In September 2016, Kaufman was inducted into the NASA Hall of Fame for his advances in ion propulsion.

He was a professor emeritus of the CSU department of physics.
