= High Power Electric Propulsion =

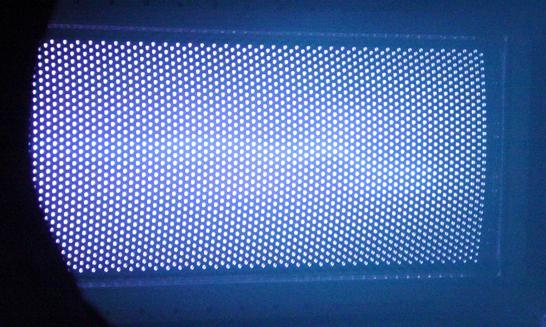
HiPEP test

High Power Electric Propulsion (HiPEP) is a variation of ion thruster for use in nuclear electric propulsion applications. It was ground-tested in 2003 by NASA and was intended for use on the Jupiter Icy Moons Orbiter, which was canceled in 2005.

== Theory ==
The HiPEP thruster differs from earlier ion thrusters because the xenon ions are produced using a combination of microwave and magnetic fields. The ionization is achieved through a process called Electron Cyclotron Resonance (ECR). In ECR, the small number of free electrons present in the neutral gas gyrate around the static magnetic field lines. The injected microwaves' frequency is set to match this gyrofrequency and a resonance is established. Energy is transferred from the right-hand polarized portion of the microwave to the electrons. This energy is then transferred to the bulk gas/plasma via the rare - yet important - collisions between electrons and neutrals. During these collisions, electrons can be knocked free from the neutrals, forming ion-electron pairs. The process is a highly efficient means of creating a plasma in low density gases. Previously the electrons required were provided by a hollow cathode.

== Specifications ==
The thruster itself is in the 20-50 kW class, with a specific impulse of 6,000-9,000 seconds, and a propellant throughput capability exceeding 100 kg/kW. The goal of the project, as of June 2003, was to achieve a technology readiness level of 4-5 within 2 years.

The pre-prototype HiPEP produced 670 millinewton (mN) of thrust at a power level of 39.3 kW using 7.0 mg/s of reaction mass, giving a specific impulse of 9620 s. Downrated to 24.4 kW, the HiPEP used 5.6 mg/s of reaction mass giving a specific impulse of 8270 s and 460 mN of thrust.

== Project and development history ==
Phase 1 of HiPEP development concluded in early 2003. Conceptual Design of the thruster was completed, and individual component testing concluded. A full-scale laboratory thruster was constructed for Phase 2 of the HiPEP's development. However, with the cancellation of the Jupiter Icy Moon Orbiter mission in 2005, HiPEP's development also came to a halt. Before cancellation, HiPEP completed a 2000 hour wear test.

== See also ==
- Exploration of Jupiter
- List of spacecraft with electric propulsion
- Solar electric propulsion
