= Dual-Stage 4-Grid =

Type of electrostatic ion thruster

The Dual-Stage 4-Grid (DS4G) is an electrostatic ion thruster design developed by the European Space Agency, in collaboration with the Australian National University. The design was derived by D. Fern from Controlled Thermonuclear Reactor experiments that use a 4-grid mechanism to accelerate ion beams.

A 4-grid ion thruster with only 0.2 m diameter is projected to absorb 250 kW power. With that energy input rate, the thruster could produce a thrust of 2.5 N. The specific impulse (a measure of fuel efficiency), could reach 19,300 s at an exhaust velocity of 210 km/s if xenon propellant was used. The potentially attainable power and thrust densities would substantially extend the power absorption of current ion thrusters to far more than 100 kW. These characteristics facilitate the development of ion thrusters that can result in extraordinary high-end velocities.

== Electrical power requirements ==
Like with thruster concepts such as VASIMR, the dual-stage-4-grid ion thrusters are mainly limited by the necessary power supply for their operation. For example, if solar panels were to supply more than 250 kW, the size of the solar array would surpass the size of the solar panels of the International Space Station. To provide 250 kW with Stirling radioisotope generators would require roughly 17 tonnes of plutonium-238 (for which the US stockpile as of 2013 was no more than 20 kg), and so a nuclear thermal reactor would be needed.

== Comparison ==
Specific impulse of various propulsion technologies
Engine	Effective exhaust velocity (m/s)	Specific impulse (s)	Exhaust specific energy (MJ/kg)
Turbofan jet engine (actual V is ~300 m/s)	29,000	3,000	Approx. 0.05
Space Shuttle Solid Rocket Booster	2,500	250	3
Liquid oxygen–liquid hydrogen	4,400	450	9.7
NSTAR electrostatic xenon ion thruster	20,000–30,000	1,950–3,100	
NEXT electrostatic xenon ion thruster	40,000	1,320–4,170	
VASIMR predictions	30,000–120,000	3,000–12,000	1,400
DS4G electrostatic ion thruster	210,000	21,400	22,500
Ideal photonic rocket (Note: A hypothetical device doing perfect conversion of mass to photons emitted perfectly aligned so as to be antiparallel to the desired thrust vector. This represents the theoretical upper limit for propulsion relying strictly on onboard fuel and the rocket principle.)	299,792,458	30,570,000	89,875,517,874

== See also ==
- Specific impulse
