= SERT-1 =

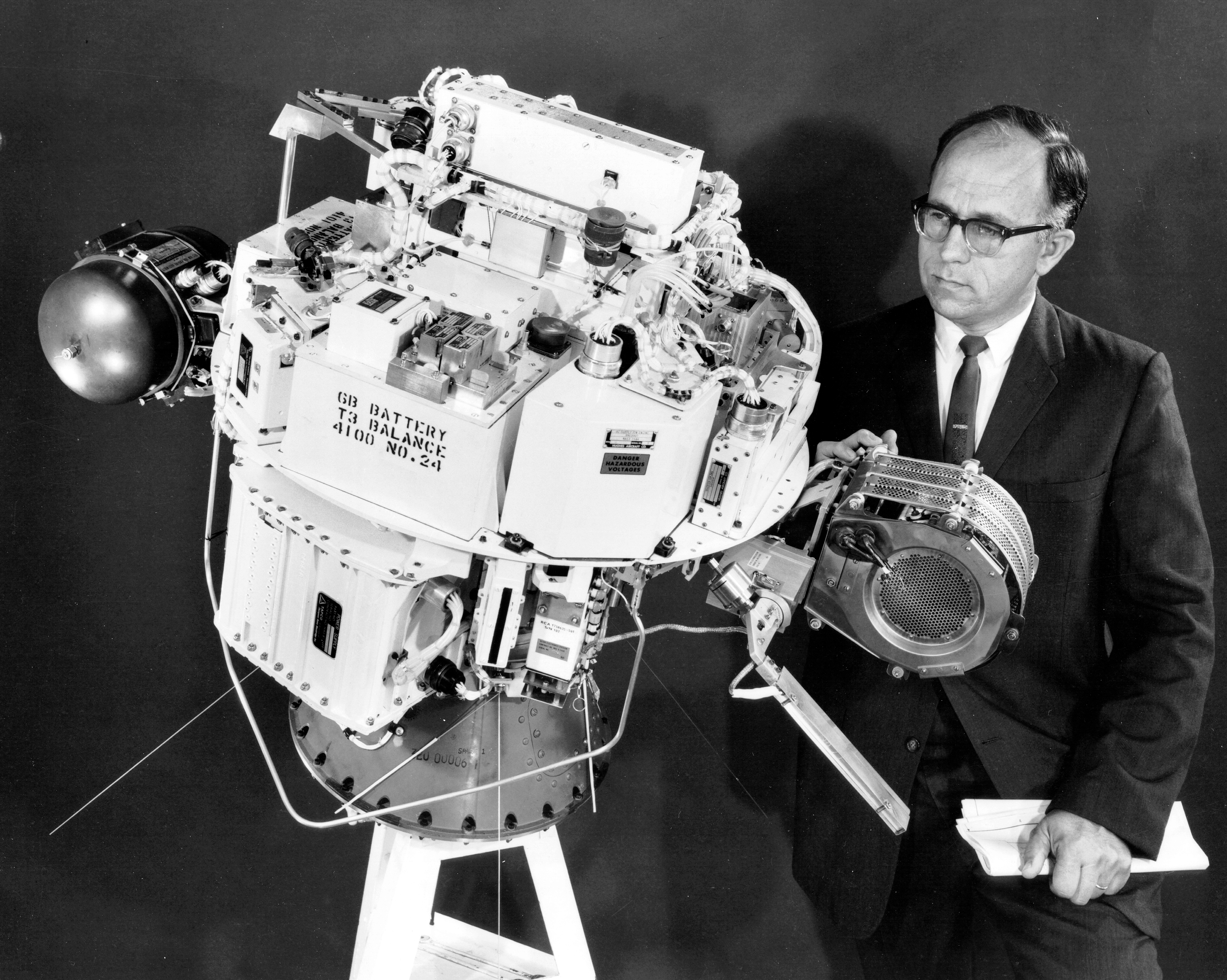
- SERT-1's Program Manager, Raymond J. Rulis examining the spacecraft
- Mission type: Technology
- Operator: NASA
- Apogee: 4,002 kilometres (2,487 mi)

Spacecraft properties
- Manufacturer: NASA Lewis Research Center

Start of mission
- Launch date: July 20, 1964, 10:53 UTC
- Rocket: Scout X-4
- Launch site: Wallops LA-3A

SERT-1 (Space Electric Rocket Test) was a NASA probe used to test electrostatic ion thruster design and was built by NASA's Lewis Research Center (now NASA Glenn). SERT-1 was the first spacecraft to utilize ion engine design. It was launched on July 20, 1964 on a Scout rocket. It carried two electric propulsion engines; of the two, the first, an electron-bombardment ion engine ("Kaufman ion thruster") was run for a total of 31 minutes and 16 seconds. This was the first time that an ion engine of any type had been operated in space, and demonstrated that the neutralizer worked as predicted. (A second thruster, of a different type, failed to operate.)

The test was followed by the SERT-II probe, launched into a 1000-km-high polar orbit on February 3, 1970, which demonstrated two mercury thrusters operating for 2011 hrs and 3781 hrs in space. Up to 300 thruster restarts were demonstrated.

The SERT rocket tests demonstrated ion engine technology that was later used on the Deep Space 1 probe and later missions.

== Technical Papers ==
Sovey, J. S., Rawlin, V. K., and Patterson, M. J.: "Ion Propulsion Development Projects in U. S.: Space Electric Rocket Test 1 to Deep Space 1," Journal of Propulsion and Power, Vol. 17, No. 3, May–June 2001, pp. 517–526.

RCA Astro-Electronics Division, SUMMARY REPORT on the DEVELOPMENT OF THE SERT I SPACECRAFT, NASA CR-54243 available at NTIS (accessed May 11, 2012).
