= PPS-1350 =

Ion thruster used by spacecraft and satellites

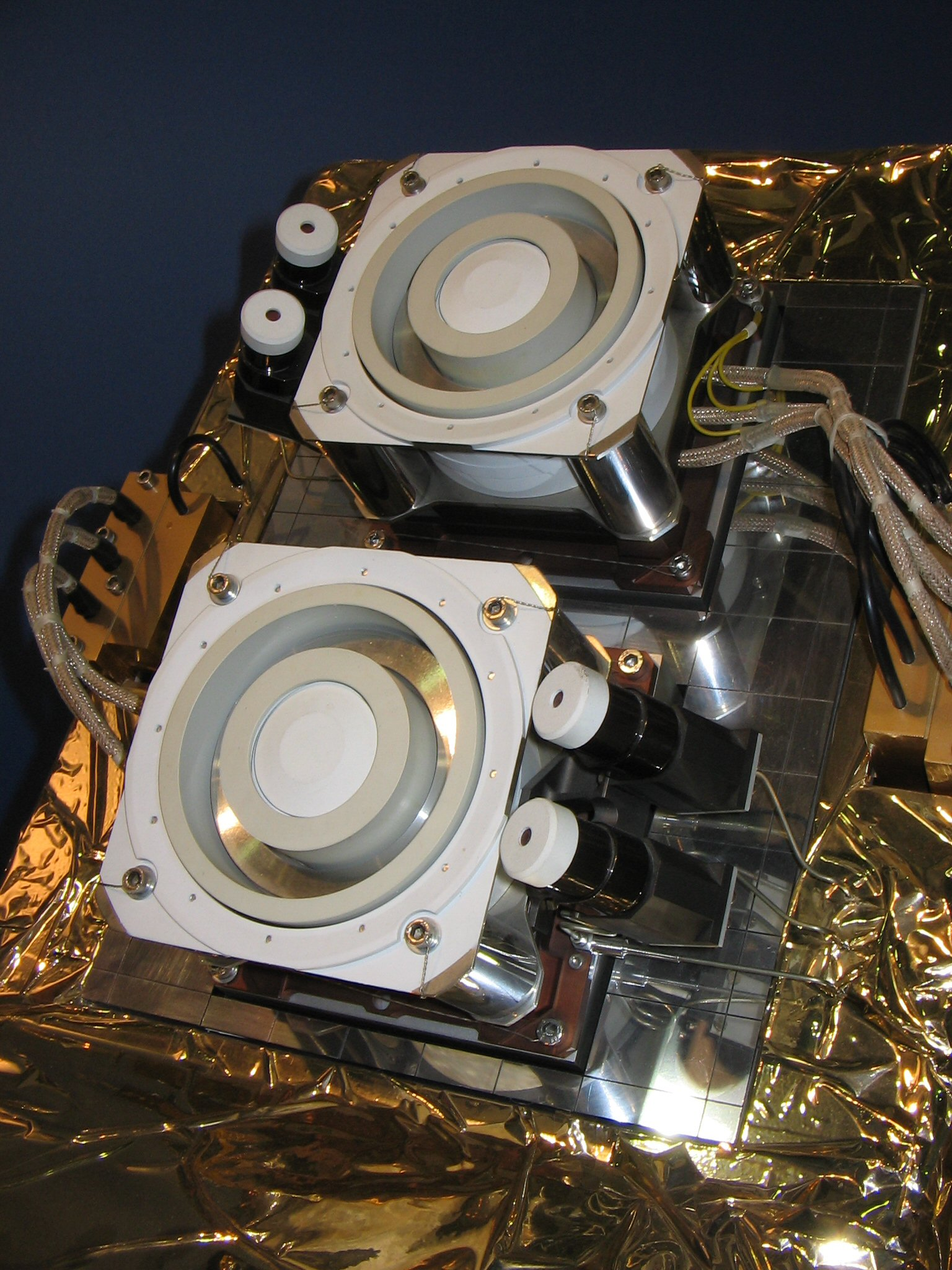
- Two Snecma PPS 1350 at the Paris Air Show 2007
- Manufacturer: Snecma

Hall-effect thruster

Performance
- Thrust: 90 mN
- Specific impulse: 1660 s
- Total impulse: 3.4×10^{6} N-s

PPS-1350 is a Hall-effect thruster, a kind of ion propulsion system for spacecraft. It was used in the SMART-1 mission to the moon and one geostationary satellites: Inmarsat-4A F4.

It creates a stream of electrically charged xenon ions accelerated by an electric field and confined by a magnetic field. The PPS-1350 is built by Snecma, a French aerospace firm, in cooperation with Fakel, who designed the SPT-100, on which the PPS 1350 is based.

== Specifications ==
Parameter	Value
Power (nominal) (W)	1500
Thrust (mN)	90
Thrust-to-power level (mN/kW)	60
Specific impulse (s)	1,660
Total impulse delivered (N.s)	3.4×10^{6}
Number of cycles	7300
Efficiency (%)	55
Supply voltage (V)	350
Discharge current (A)	4.28
Xenon supply pressure (bar)	2.50 — 2.80
Mass (including 2 Xe flow control systems) (kg)	5.30

== See also ==
- Comparison of orbital rocket engines
