= Ion thruster =

Form of electric spacecraft propulsion

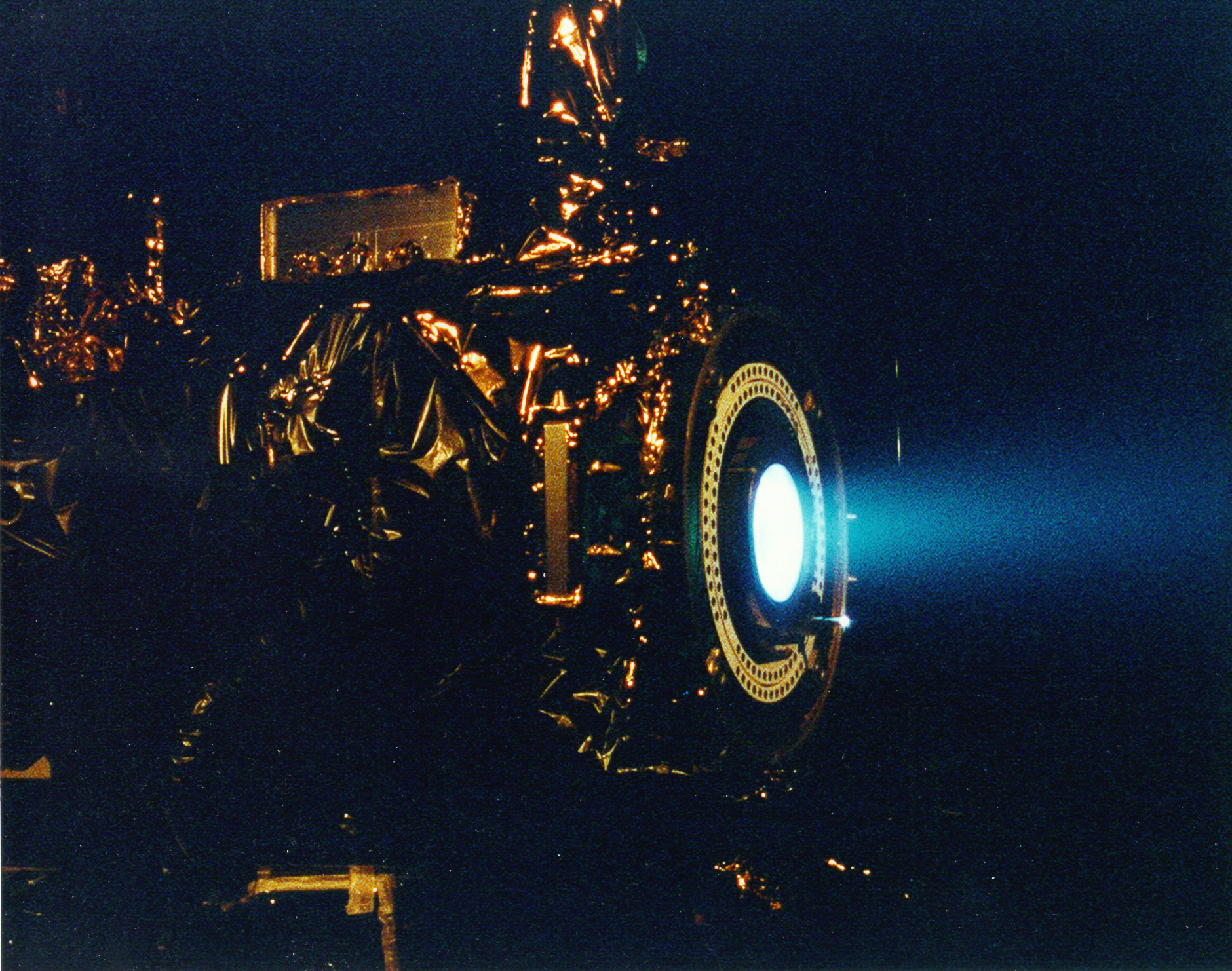
The 2.3 kW NSTAR ion thruster developed by NASA for the Deep Space 1 spacecraft during a hot fire test at the Jet Propulsion Laboratory (1999)

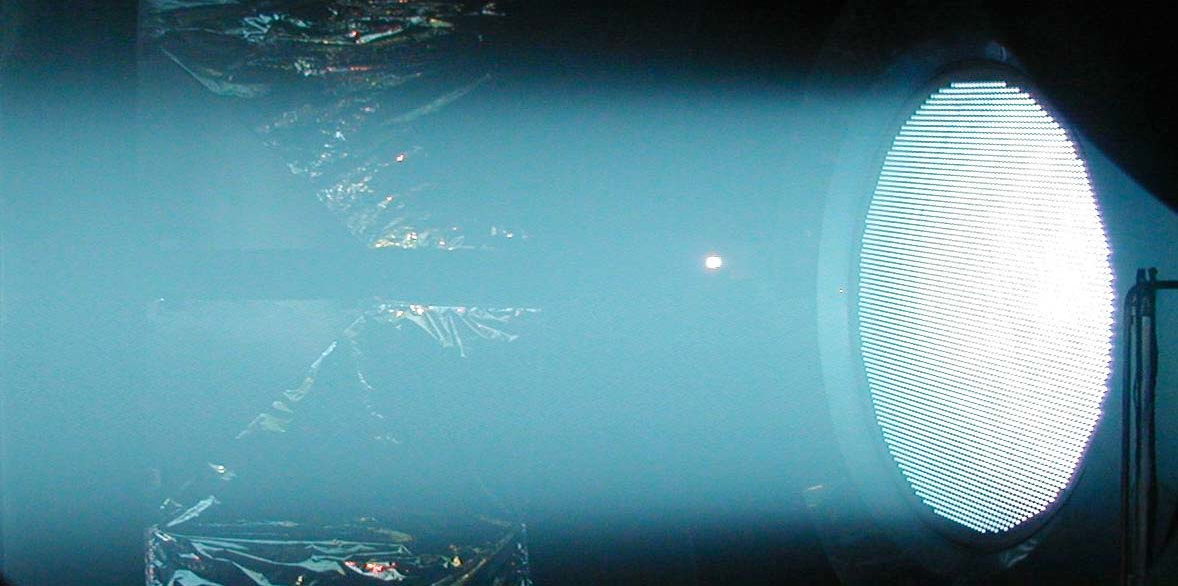
NEXIS ion engine test (2005)

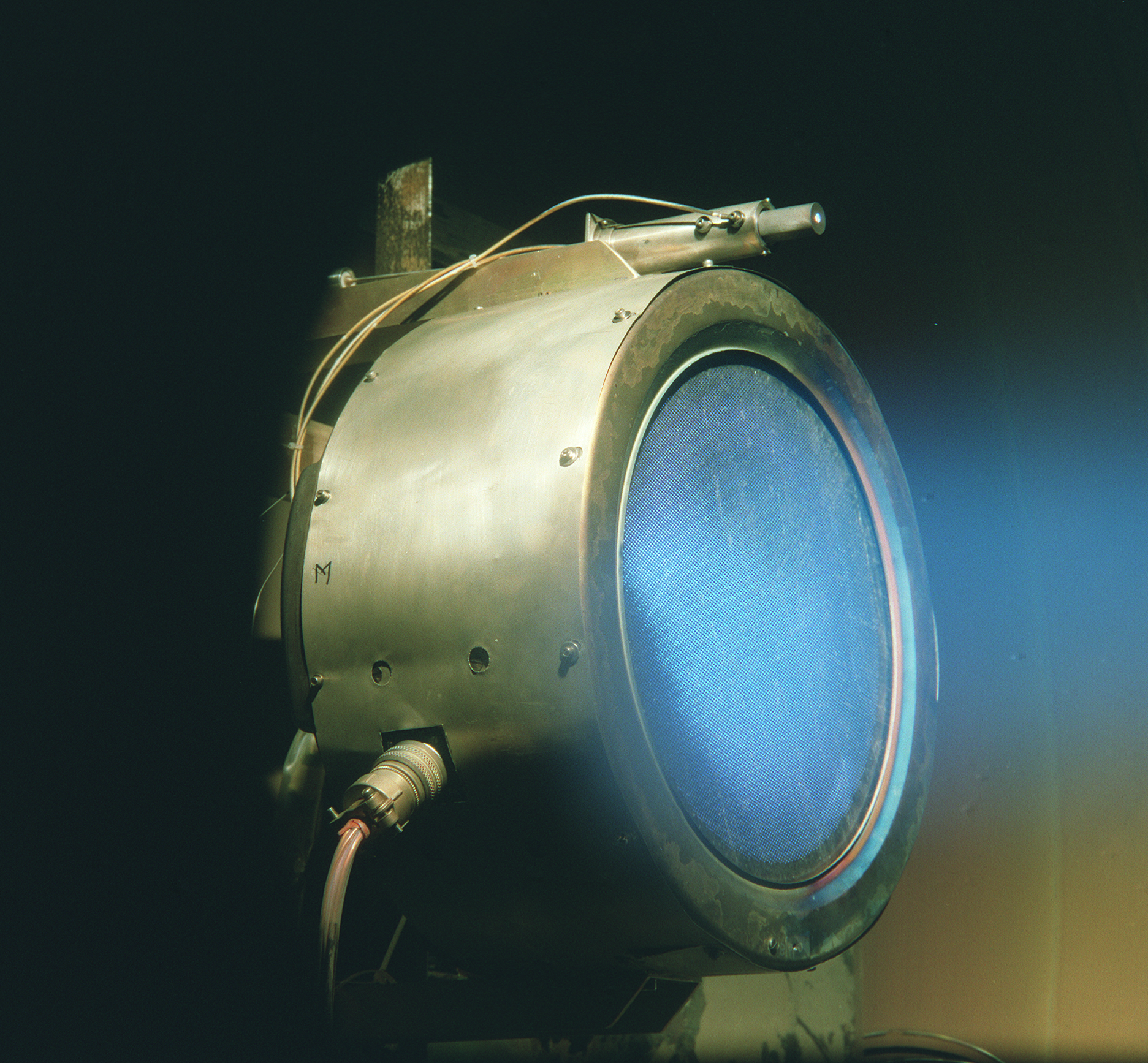
A prototype of a xenon ion engine being tested at NASA's Jet Propulsion Laboratory (2005)

An ion thruster, ion drive, or ion engine is a form of electric propulsion used for spacecraft propulsion. An ion thruster creates a cloud of positive ions from a neutral gas by ionizing it to extract some electrons from its atoms. The ions are then accelerated using electricity to create thrust. Ion thrusters are categorized as either electrostatic or electromagnetic.

Electrostatic thruster ions are accelerated by the Coulomb force along the electric field direction. Temporarily stored electrons are reinjected by a neutralizer in the cloud of ions after it has passed through the electrostatic grid, so the gas becomes neutral again and can freely disperse in space without any further electrical interaction with the thruster.

By contrast, electromagnetic thruster ions are accelerated by the Lorentz force to accelerate all species (free electrons as well as positive and negative ions) in the same direction whatever their electric charge, and are specifically referred to as plasma propulsion engines, where the electric field is not in the direction of the acceleration.

Ion thrusters in operation typically consume 1–7 kW of power, have exhaust velocities around 20–50 km/s (12–30 mi/s, I_{sp} 2000–5000 s), and possess thrusts of 25–250 mN and a propulsive efficiency of 65–80%; experimental ion thrusters have achieved 100 kW (130 hp), 5 N (1.1 lb_{f}).

The 1998 Deep Space 1 spacecraft changed velocity by 4.3 km/s (2.7 mi/s) with its ion thruster, and consumed 73.4 kg (162 lb) of xenon. The 2007 Dawn spacecraft achieved velocity change of 11.5 km/s (7.1 mi/s), though with less efficiency, having consumed 425 kg (937 lb) of xenon.

Applications include control of the orientation and position of orbiting satellites (some satellites have dozens of low-power ion thrusters), use as a main propulsion engine for low-mass robotic space vehicles (such as Deep Space 1 and Dawn), and serving as propulsion thrusters for crewed spacecraft and space stations (e.g. Tiangong).

Ion thrust engines are generally practical only in the vacuum of space as the engine's minuscule thrust cannot overcome any significant air resistance without radical design changes, as may be found in the 'Atmosphere Breathing Electric Propulsion' concept. The Massachusetts Institute of Technology (MIT) has created designs that are able to fly for short distances and at low speeds at ground level, using ultra-light materials and low drag aerofoils. An ion engine cannot usually generate sufficient thrust to achieve initial liftoff from any celestial body with significant surface gravity. For these reasons, spacecraft must rely on other methods such as conventional chemical rockets or non-rocket launch technologies to reach their initial orbit.

== Origins ==
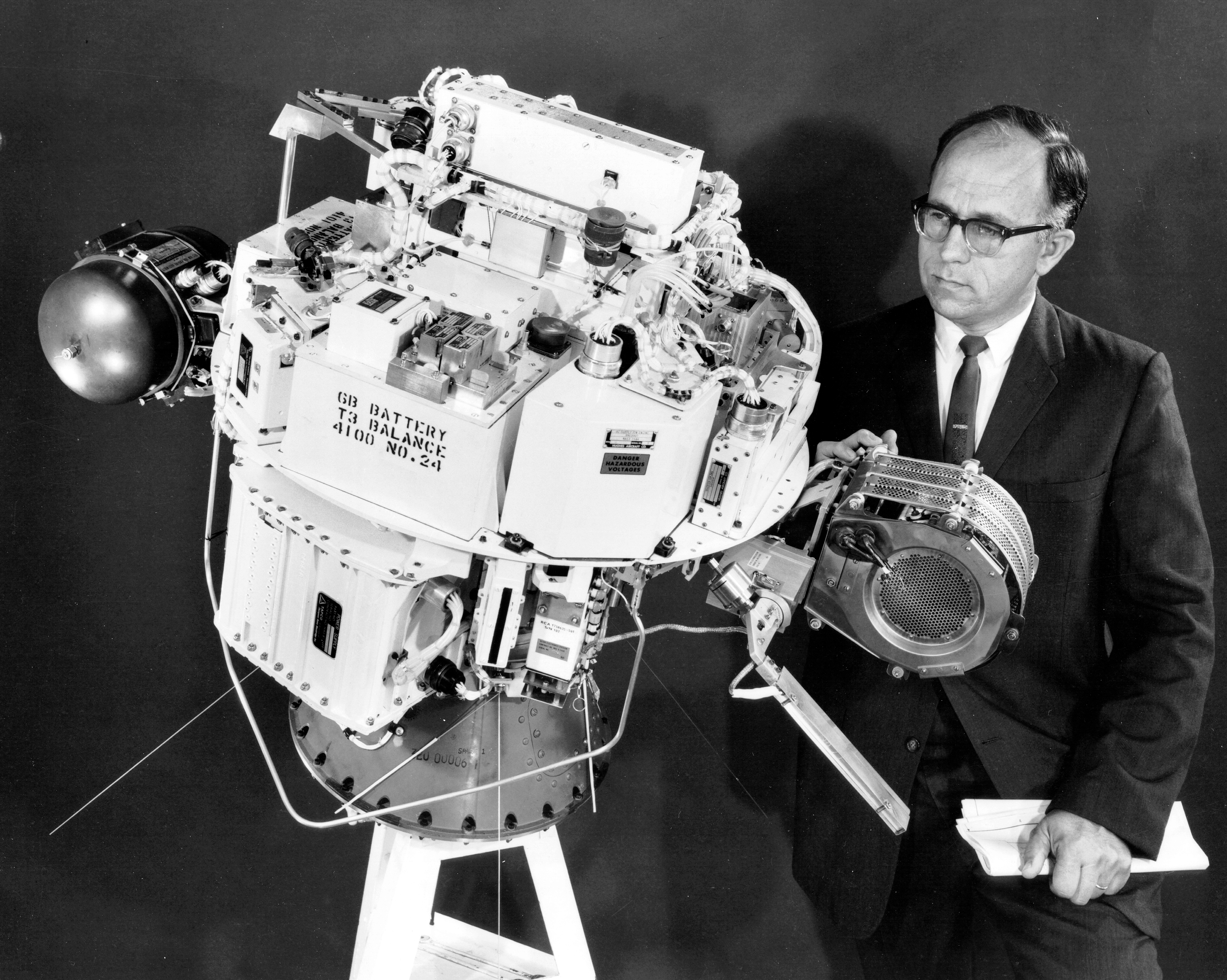
SERT-1 spacecraft

Robert H. Goddard first suggested the use of electric propulsion in 1906 and later expanded the idea in a document for the Smithsonian titled Report Concerning Further Development, having presented two early patents in 1920 (US1363037, Method Of And Means For Producing Electrified Jets Of Gas) and 1931 (US1809115, Apparatus For Producing Ions). From 1910 to 1928 he carried out intermittent work using electrical devices in experiments aimed at determining the feasibility of ion propulsion for space travel. The Ion Collector together with the Ion Propulsion Test Tube are preserved in the National Air and Space Museum. In 1925–1926 he had two of his students working with him on this subject, producing independent results. The technique was recommended for near-vacuum conditions at high altitude, but thrust was demonstrated with ionized air streams at atmospheric pressure. The idea appeared again in Hermann Oberth's Wege zur Raumschiffahrt (1929; Ways to Spaceflight), where he explained his thoughts on the mass savings of electric propulsion, predicted its use in spacecraft propulsion and attitude control, and advocated electrostatic acceleration of charged gases.

The concept of an ion thruster spacecraft was first popularized in a science fiction story by American Jack Williamson in 1947. It subsequently became a staple of genre science fiction stories.

A working ion thruster was built by Harold R. Kaufman in 1959 at the NASA Glenn Research Center facilities. It was similar to a gridded electrostatic ion thruster and used mercury for propellant. Suborbital tests were conducted during the 1960s and in 1964, and the engine was sent into a suborbital flight aboard the Space Electric Rocket Test-1 (SERT-1). It successfully operated for the planned 31 minutes before falling to Earth. This test was followed by an orbital test, SERT-2, in 1970.

On the 12 October 1964 Voskhod 1 carried out tests with ion thrusters that had been attached to the exterior of the spacecraft.

An alternate form of electric propulsion, the Hall-effect thruster, was studied independently in the United States and the Soviet Union in the 1950s and 1960s. Hall-effect thrusters operated on Soviet satellites from 1972 until the late 1990s, mainly used for satellite stabilization in north–south and in east–west directions. Some 100–200 engines completed missions on Soviet and Russian satellites. Soviet thruster design was introduced to the West in 1992 after a team of electric propulsion specialists, under the support of the Ballistic Missile Defense Organization, visited Soviet laboratories.

== General working principle ==
Ion thrusters use beams of ions (electrically charged atoms or molecules) to create thrust in accordance with momentum conservation. The method of accelerating the ions varies, but all designs take advantage of the charge/mass ratio of the ions. This ratio means that relatively small potential differences can create high exhaust velocities. This reduces the amount of reaction mass or propellant required, but increases the amount of specific power required compared to chemical rockets. Ion thrusters are therefore able to achieve high specific impulses. The drawback of the low thrust is low acceleration because the mass of the electric power unit directly correlates with the amount of power. This low thrust makes ion thrusters unsuited for launching spacecraft into orbit, but effective for in-space propulsion over longer periods of time.

Ion thrusters are categorized as either electrostatic or electromagnetic. The main difference is the method of accelerating the ions:

- Electrostatic ion thrusters use the Coulomb force and accelerate the ions in the direction of the electric field.
- Electromagnetic ion thrusters use the Lorentz force to accelerate the ions in the direction perpendicular to the electric field.

Electric power for ion thrusters is usually provided by solar panels. However, for sufficiently large distances from the sun, nuclear power may be used. In each case, the power supply mass is proportional to the peak power that can be supplied, and both provide, for this application, almost no limit to the energy.

Electric thrusters tend to produce low thrust, which results in low acceleration. Defining $1g = 9.81\; \mathrm{m/s^2}$, the standard gravitational acceleration of Earth, and noting that $F = ma \implies a = F/m$, this can be analyzed. An NSTAR thruster producing a thrust force of 92 mN will accelerate a satellite with a mass of 1 ton by 0.092 N / 1000 kg = 9.2×10^{−5} m/s^{2} (or 9.38×10^{−6} g). However, this acceleration can be sustained for months or years at a time, in contrast to the very short burns of chemical rockets.

$$F = 2 \frac{\eta P}{g I_\text{sp}}$$
Where:

- F is the thrust force in N,
- η is the efficiency
- P is the electrical power used by the thruster in W, and
- I_{sp} is the specific impulse in seconds.

The ion thruster is not the most promising type of electrically powered spacecraft propulsion, but it is the most successful in practice to date. An ion drive would require two days to accelerate a car to highway speed in vacuum. The technical characteristics, especially thrust, are considerably inferior to the prototypes described in literature. Technical capabilities are limited by the space charge created by ions, which limits the thrust density— the force per cross-sectional area of the engine. Ion thrusters create small thrust levels compared to conventional chemical rockets (the thrust of Deep Space 1 being approximately equal to the weight of one sheet of paper, for example) but achieve high specific impulse— also known as propellant mass efficiency— by accelerating the exhaust to high speed. The power imparted to the exhaust increases with the square of exhaust velocity while thrust increase is linear. Conversely, chemical rockets provide high thrust, but are limited in total impulse by the small amount of energy that can be stored chemically in the propellants. Given the practical weight of suitable power sources, the acceleration from an ion thruster is frequently less than one-thousandth of standard gravity. However, since they operate as electric (or electrostatic) motors, they convert a greater fraction of input power into kinetic exhaust power. Chemical rockets operate as heat engines, and Carnot's theorem limits the exhaust velocity.

== Electrostatic thrusters ==
=== Gridded electrostatic ion thrusters ===
A diagram of how a gridded electrostatic ion engine (multipole magnetic cusp type) works

Gridded electrostatic ion thrusters development started in the 1960s and, since then, they have been used for commercial satellite propulsion and scientific missions. Their main feature is that the propellant ionization process is physically separated from the ion acceleration process.

The ionization process takes place in the discharge chamber, where by bombarding the propellant with energetic electrons, as the energy transferred ejects valence electrons from the propellant gas's atoms. These electrons can be provided by a hot cathode filament and accelerated through the potential difference towards an anode. Alternatively, the electrons can be accelerated by an oscillating induced electric field created by an alternating electromagnet, which results in a self-sustaining discharge without a cathode (radio frequency ion thruster).

The positively charged ions are extracted by a system consisting of 2 or 3 multi-aperture grids. After entering the grid system near the plasma sheath, the ions are accelerated by the potential difference between the first grid and second grid (called the screen grid and the accelerator grid, respectively) to the final ion energy of (typically) 1–2 keV, which generates thrust.

Ion thrusters emit a beam of positively charged ions. To keep the spacecraft from accumulating a charge, another cathode is placed near the engine to emit electrons into the ion beam, leaving the propellant electrically neutral. This prevents the beam of ions from being attracted (and returning) to the spacecraft, which would cancel the thrust.

Gridded electrostatic ion thruster research (past/present):

- NASA Solar Technology Application Readiness (NSTAR), 2.3 kW, used on two successful missions
- NASA's Evolutionary Xenon Thruster (NEXT), 6.9 kW, flight qualification hardware built; used on DART mission
- Nuclear Electric Xenon Ion System (NEXIS)
- High Power Electric Propulsion (HiPEP), 25 kW, test example built and run briefly on the ground
- EADS Radio-frequency Ion Thruster (RIT)
- Dual-Stage 4-Grid (DS4G)

=== Hall-effect thrusters ===
Schematic of a Hall-effect thruster

Hall-effect thrusters accelerate ions by means of an electric potential between a cylindrical anode and a negatively charged plasma that forms the cathode. The bulk of the propellant (typically xenon) is introduced near the anode, where it ionizes and flows toward the cathode; ions accelerate towards and through it, picking up electrons as they leave to neutralize the beam and leave the thruster at high velocity.

The anode is at one end of a cylindrical tube. In the center is a spike that is wound to produce a radial magnetic field between it and the surrounding tube. The ions are largely unaffected by the magnetic field, since they are too massive. However, the electrons produced near the end of the spike to create the cathode are trapped by the magnetic field and held in place by their attraction to the anode. Some of the electrons spiral down towards the anode, circulating around the spike in a Hall current. When they reach the anode they impact the uncharged propellant and cause it to be ionized, before finally reaching the anode and completing the circuit.

=== Field-emission electric propulsion ===
Field-emission electric propulsion (FEEP) thrusters may use caesium or indium propellants. The design comprises a small propellant reservoir that stores the liquid metal, a narrow tube or a system of parallel plates that the liquid flows through and an accelerator (a ring or an elongated aperture in a metallic plate) about a millimeter past the tube end. Caesium and indium are used due to their high atomic weights, low ionization potentials and low melting points. Once the liquid metal reaches the end of the tube, an electric field applied between the emitter and the accelerator causes the liquid surface to deform into a series of protruding cusps, or Taylor cones. At a sufficiently high applied voltage, positive ions are extracted from the tips of the cones. The electric field created by the emitter and the accelerator then accelerates the ions. An external source of electrons neutralizes the positively charged ion stream to prevent charging of the spacecraft.

== Electromagnetic thrusters ==
=== Pulsed inductive thrusters ===
Pulsed inductive thrusters (PITs) use pulses instead of continuous thrust and have the ability to run on power levels on the order of megawatts (MW). PITs consist of a large coil encircling a cone shaped tube that emits the propellant gas. Ammonia is the gas most commonly used. For each pulse, a large charge builds up in a group of capacitors behind the coil and is then released. This creates a current that moves circularly in the direction of jθ. The current then creates a magnetic field in the outward radial direction (Br), which then creates a current in the gas that has just been released in the opposite direction of the original current. This opposite current ionizes the ammonia. The positively charged ions are accelerated away from the engine due to the electric field jθ crossing the magnetic field Br, due to the Lorentz force.

=== Magnetoplasmadynamic thruster ===
Magnetoplasmadynamic (MPD) thrusters and lithium Lorentz force accelerator (LiLFA) thrusters use roughly the same idea. The LiLFA thruster builds on the MPD thruster. Hydrogen, argon, ammonia and nitrogen can be used as propellant. In a certain configuration, the ambient gas in low Earth orbit (LEO) can be used as a propellant. The gas enters the main chamber where it is ionized into plasma by the electric field between the anode and the cathode. This plasma then conducts electricity between the anode and the cathode, closing the circuit. This new current creates a magnetic field around the cathode, which crosses with the electric field, thereby accelerating the plasma due to the Lorentz force.

The LiLFA thruster uses the same general idea as the MPD thruster, though with two main differences. First, the LiLFA uses lithium vapor, which can be stored as a solid. The other difference is that the single cathode is replaced by multiple, smaller cathode rods packed into a hollow cathode tube. MPD cathodes are easily corroded due to constant contact with the plasma. In the LiLFA thruster, the lithium vapor is injected into the hollow cathode and is not ionized to its plasma form/corrode the cathode rods until it exits the tube. The plasma is then accelerated using the same Lorentz force.

In 2013, the Russian company Chemical Automatics Design Bureau successfully conducted a bench test of their MPD engine for long-distance space travel.

=== Electrodeless plasma thrusters ===
Electrodeless plasma thrusters have two unique features: the removal of the anode and cathode electrodes and the ability to throttle the engine. The removal of the electrodes eliminates erosion, which limits lifetime on other ion engines. Neutral gas is first ionized by electromagnetic waves and then transferred to another chamber where it is accelerated by an oscillating electric and magnetic field, also known as the ponderomotive force. This separation of the ionization and acceleration stages allows throttling of propellant flow, which then changes the thrust magnitude and specific impulse values.

=== Helicon double layer thrusters ===
A helicon double layer thruster is a type of plasma thruster that ejects high velocity ionized gas to provide thrust. In this design, gas is injected into a tubular chamber (the source tube) with one open end. Radio frequency AC power (at 13.56 MHz in the prototype design) is coupled into a specially shaped antenna wrapped around the chamber. The electromagnetic wave emitted by the antenna causes the gas to break down and form a plasma. The antenna then excites a helicon wave in the plasma, which further heats it. The device has a roughly constant magnetic field in the source tube (supplied by solenoids in the prototype), but the magnetic field diverges and rapidly decreases in magnitude away from the source region and might be thought of as a kind of magnetic nozzle. In operation, a sharp boundary separates the high density plasma inside the source region and the low density plasma in the exhaust, which is associated with a sharp change in electrical potential. Plasma properties change rapidly across this boundary, which is known as a current-free electric double layer. The electrical potential is much higher inside the source region than in the exhaust and this serves both to confine most of the electrons and to accelerate the ions away from the source region. Enough electrons escape the source region to ensure that the plasma in the exhaust is neutral overall.

=== Variable Specific Impulse Magnetoplasma Rocket (VASIMR) ===
The proposed Variable Specific Impulse Magnetoplasma Rocket (VASIMR) functions by using radio waves to ionize a propellant into a plasma, and then using a magnetic field to accelerate the plasma out of the back of the rocket engine to generate thrust. The VASIMR is currently being developed by Ad Astra Rocket Company, headquartered in Houston, Texas, with help from Canada-based Nautel, producing the 200 kW RF generators for ionizing propellant. Some of the components and "plasma shoots" experiments are tested in a laboratory settled in Liberia, Costa Rica. This project is led by former NASA astronaut Franklin Chang-Díaz (CRC-USA). A 200 kW VASIMR test engine was in discussion to be fitted in the exterior of the International Space Station, as part of the plan to test the VASIMR in space; however, plans for this test onboard ISS were canceled in 2015 by NASA, with a free flying VASIMR test being discussed by Ad Astra instead. An envisioned 200 MW engine could reduce the duration of flight from Earth to Jupiter or Saturn from six years to fourteen months, and Mars from 7 months to 39 days.

=== Microwave electrothermal thrusters ===
Microwave electrothermal thruster

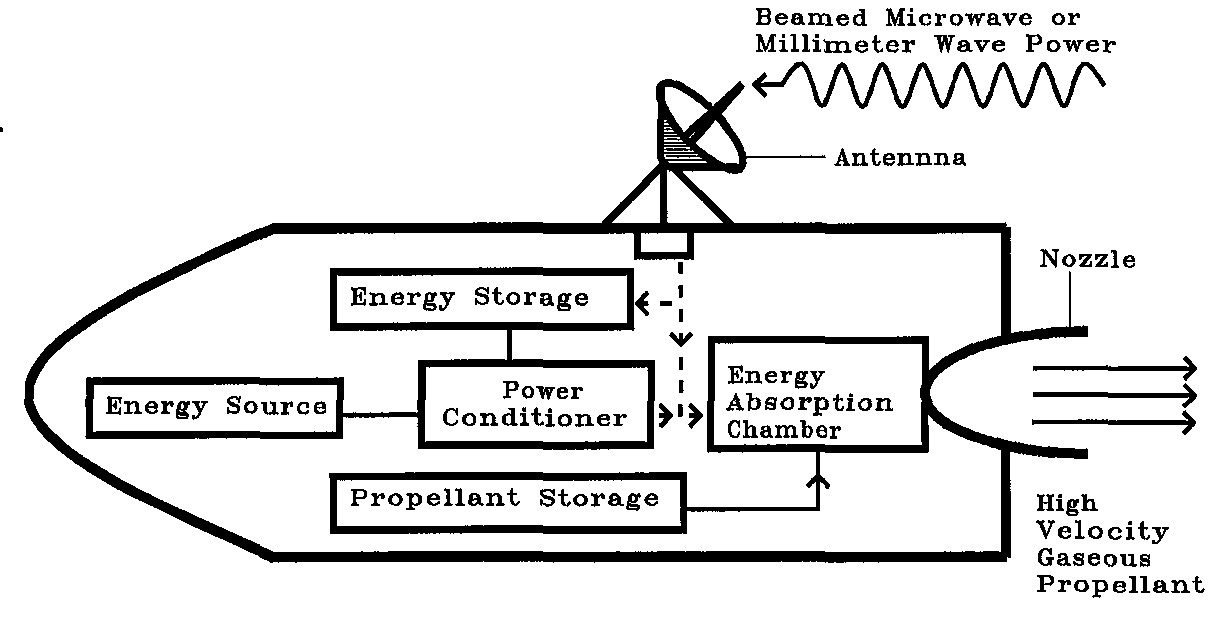
Thruster components

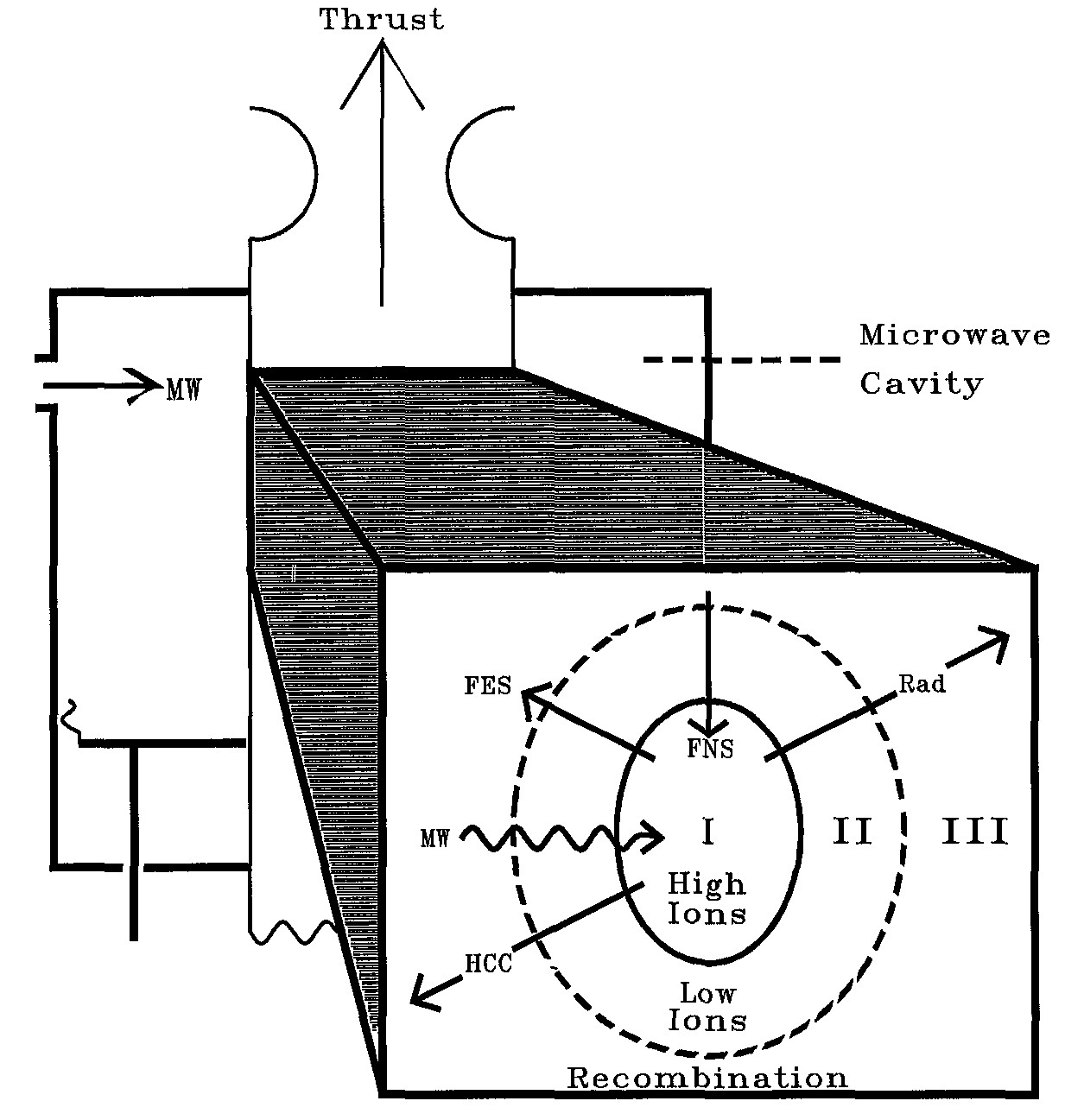
Discharge chamber

Under a research grant from the NASA Lewis Research Center during the 1980s and 1990s, Martin C. Hawley and Jes Asmussen led a team of engineers in developing a microwave electrothermal thruster (MET).

In the discharge chamber, microwave (MW) energy flows into the center containing a high level of ions (I), causing neutral species in the gaseous propellant to ionize. Excited species flow out (FES) through the low ion region (II) to a neutral region (III) where the ions complete their recombination, replaced with the flow of neutral species (FNS) towards the center. Meanwhile, energy is lost to the chamber walls through heat conduction and convection (HCC), along with radiation (Rad). The remaining energy absorbed into the gaseous propellant is converted into thrust.

== Radioisotope thruster ==
A theoretical propulsion system has been proposed, based on alpha particles (He^{2+} or ^{4}_{2}He^{2+} indicating a helium ion with a +2 charge) emitted from a radioisotope uni-directionally through a hole in its chamber. A neutralising electron gun would produce a tiny amount of thrust with high specific impulse in the order of millions of seconds due to the high relativistic speed of alpha particles.

A variant of this uses a graphite-based grid with a static DC high voltage to increase thrust as graphite has high transparency to alpha particles if it is also irradiated with short wave UV light at the correct wavelength from a solid-state emitter. It also permits lower energy and longer half-life sources which would be advantageous for a space application. Helium backfill has also been suggested as a way to increase electron mean free path.

== Comparisons ==
Test data of some ion thrusters
| Thruster | Propellant | Input power (kW) | Specific impulse (s) | Thrust (mN) | Thruster mass (kg) | Notes |
|---|---|---|---|---|---|---|
| NSTAR | Xenon | 2.3 | 1700–3300 | 92 max. | 8.33 | Used on the Deep Space 1 and Dawn space probes. |
| PPS-1350 Hall effect | Xenon | 1.5 | 1660 | 90 | 5.3 | |
| SPT-140 | Xenon | 4.5 | 1800 | 280 | 8.5 | Used in Psyche mission. |
| NEXT | Xenon | 6.9 | 4190 | 236 max. | <13.5 | Used in DART mission. |
| X3 Hall effect | Xenon or krypton | 102 | 1800–2650 | 5400 | 230 | |
| NEXIS | Xenon | 20.5 | | | | |
| RIT 22 | Xenon | 5 | | | | |
| BHT-8000 | Xenon | 8 | 2210 | 449 | 25 | |
| Hall effect | Xenon | 75 | | | | |
| FEEP | Liquid caesium | 6×10^{−5}–0.06 | 6000–10000 | 0.001–1 | | |
| NPT30-I2 | Iodine | 0.034–0.066 | 1000–2500 | 0.5–1.5 | 1.2 | |
| Starlink Gen1 Hall effect | Krypton | | ~1667 | ~70.83 | | |
| Starlink Gen2 Hall effect | Argon | 4.2 | 2500 | 170 | 2.1 | Used in Starlink V2 mini satellites. |
| AEPS | Xenon | 13.3 | 2900 | 600 | 25 | Originally designed to be used in Lunar Gateway PPE module, which is being repurposed for the SR-1 Freedom. |
| Qinetiq T6 | Xenon | 4.6 | 4300 | 145 | | Used in European-Japanese BepiColombo. |

Experimental thrusters (no mission to date)
| Thruster | Propellant | Input power (kW) | Specific impulse (s) | Thrust (mN) | Thruster mass (kg) | Notes |
|---|---|---|---|---|---|---|
| Hall effect | Bismuth | 1.9 | 1520 (anode) | 143 (discharge) | | |
| Hall effect | Bismuth | 25 | | | | |
| Hall effect | Bismuth | 140 | | | | |
| Hall effect | Iodine | 0.2 | 1510 (anode) | 12.1 (discharge) | | |
| Hall effect | Iodine | 7 | 1950 | 413 | | |
| HiPEP | Xenon | 20–50 | 6000–9000 | 460–670 | | |
| MPDT | Hydrogen | 1500 | 4900 | 26300 | | |
| MPDT | Hydrogen | 3750 | 3500 | 88500 | | |
| MPDT | Hydrogen | 7500 | 6000 | 60000 | | |
| LiLFA | Lithium vapor | 500 | 4077 | 12000 | | |
| FEEP | Liquid caesium | 6×10^{−5}–0.06 | 6000–10000 | 0.001–1 | | |
| VASIMR | Argon | 200 | 3000–12000 | Approximately 5000 | 620 | |
| CAT | Xenon, iodine, water | 0.01 | 690 | 1.1–2 (73 mN/kW) | <1 | |
| DS4G | Xenon | 250 | 19300 | 2500 max. | 5 | |
| KLIMT | Krypton | 0.5 | | | 4 | |
| ID-500 | Xenon | 32–35 | 7140 | 375–750 | 34.8 | To be used in TEM |

== Lifetime ==
Ion thrusters' low thrust requires continuous operation for a long time to achieve the necessary change in velocity (delta-v) for a particular mission. Ion thrusters are designed to provide continuous operation for intervals of weeks to years.

The lifetime of electrostatic ion thrusters is limited by several processes.

=== Gridded thruster life ===
In electrostatic gridded designs, charge-exchange ions produced by the beam ions with the neutral gas flow can be accelerated towards the negatively biased accelerator grid and cause grid erosion. End-of-life is reached when either the grid structure fails or the holes in the grid become large enough that ion extraction is substantially affected – e.g., by the occurrence of electron backstreaming. Grid erosion cannot be avoided and is the major lifetime-limiting factor. Thorough grid design and material selection enable lifetimes of 20,000 hours or more.

A test of the NASA Solar Technology Application Readiness (NSTAR) electrostatic ion thruster resulted in 30,472 hours (roughly 3.5 years) of continuous thrust at maximum power. Post-test examination indicated the engine was not approaching failure. NSTAR operated for years on Dawn.

The NASA Evolutionary Xenon Thruster (NEXT) project operated continuously for more than 48,000 hours. The test was conducted in a high-vacuum test chamber. Over the course of the test, which lasted more than five and a half years, the engine consumed approximately 870 kilograms of xenon propellant. The total impulse generated would require over 10,000 kilograms of conventional rocket propellant for a similar application.

=== Hall-effect thruster life ===
Hall-effect thrusters suffer from strong erosion of the ceramic discharge chamber by impact of energetic ions: a test reported in 2010 showed erosion of around 1 mm per hundred hours of operation, though this is inconsistent with observed on-orbit lifetimes of a few thousand hours.

The Advanced Electric Propulsion System (AEPS) is expected to accumulate about 5,000 hours and the design aims to achieve a flight model that offers a half-life of at least 23,000 hours and a full life of about 50,000 hours.

== Propellants ==
Ionization energy represents a large percentage of the energy needed to run ion drives. The ideal propellant is thus easy to ionize and has a high mass/ionization energy ratio. In addition, the propellant should not erode the thruster to any great degree, so as to permit long life, and should not contaminate the vehicle.

Many designs use xenon gas, as it is easy to ionize, has a reasonably high atomic number, is inert and causes low erosion. However, xenon is globally in short supply and expensive (approximately $3,000 per kg in 2021).

Some older ion thruster designs used mercury propellant. However, mercury is toxic, tended to contaminate spacecraft, and was difficult to feed accurately. A modern commercial prototype may be using mercury successfully however, mercury was formally banned as a propellant in 2022 by the Minamata Convention on Mercury.

From 2018–2023, krypton was used to fuel the Hall-effect thrusters aboard Starlink internet satellites, in part due to its lower cost than conventional xenon propellant. Starlink V2-mini satellites have since switched to argon Hall-effect thrusters, providing higher specific impulse.

Other propellants, such as bismuth and iodine, show promise both for gridless designs such as Hall-effect thrusters, and gridded ion thrusters.

Iodine was used as a propellant for the first time in space, in the NPT30-I2 gridded ion thruster by ThrustMe, on board the Beihangkongshi-1 mission launched in November 2020, with an extensive report published a year later in the journal Nature. The CubeSat Ambipolar Thruster (CAT) used on the Mars Array of Ionospheric Research Satellites Using the CubeSat Ambipolar Thruster (MARS-CAT) mission also proposes to use solid iodine as the propellant to minimize storage volume.

VASIMR design (and other plasma-based engines) are theoretically able to use practically any material for propellant. However, tests show the most practical propellant is argon, which is relatively abundant and inexpensive.

== Energy efficiency ==
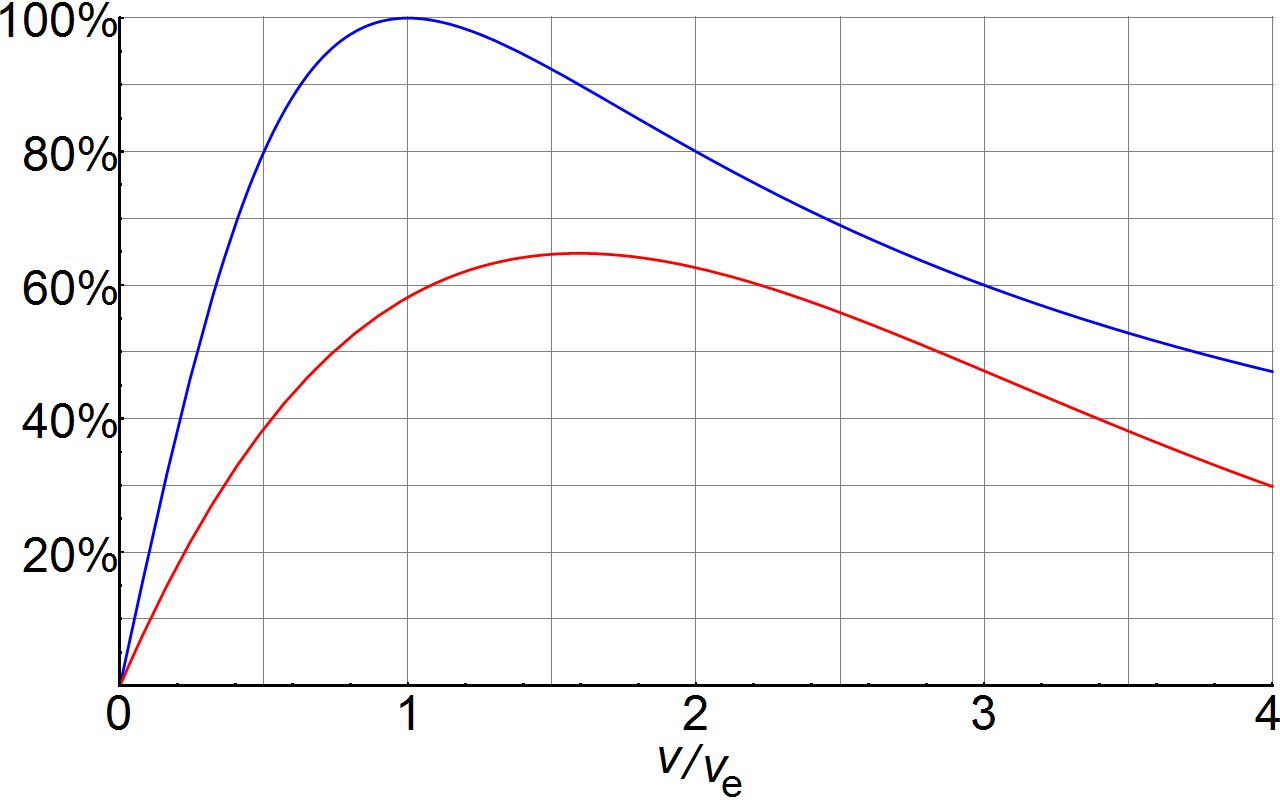
Plot of instantaneous propulsive efficiency and overall efficiency for a vehicle accelerating from rest as percentages of the engine efficiency. Note that peak vehicle efficiency occurs at about 1.6 times exhaust velocity.

Ion thruster efficiency is the kinetic energy of the exhaust jet emitted per second divided by the electrical power into the device.

Overall system energy efficiency is determined by the propulsive efficiency, which depends on vehicle speed and exhaust speed. Some thrusters can vary exhaust speed in operation, but all can be designed with different exhaust speeds. At the lower end of specific impulse, I_{sp}, the overall efficiency drops because ionization takes up a larger percentage energy and at the high end propulsive efficiency is reduced.

Optimal efficiencies and exhaust velocities for any given mission can be calculated to give minimum overall cost.

== Missions ==
Ion thrusters have many in-space propulsion applications. The best applications make use of the long mission interval when significant thrust is not needed. Examples of this include orbit transfers, attitude adjustments, drag compensation for low Earth orbits, fine adjustments for scientific missions and cargo transport between propellant depots, e.g., for chemical fuels. Ion thrusters can also be used for interplanetary and deep-space missions where acceleration rates are not crucial. Ion thrusters are seen as the best solution for these missions, as they require high change in velocity but do not require rapid acceleration. Continuous thrust over long durations can reach high velocities while consuming far less propellant than traditional chemical rockets.

=== Demonstration vehicles ===
==== SERT ====
Ion propulsion systems were first demonstrated in space by the NASA Lewis (now Glenn Research Center) missions Space Electric Rocket Test (SERT)-1 and SERT-2A. A SERT-1 suborbital flight was launched on 20 July 1964, and successfully proved that the technology operated as predicted in space. These were electrostatic ion thrusters using mercury and caesium as the reaction mass. SERT-2A, launched on 4 February 1970, verified the operation of two mercury ion engines for thousands of running hours.

=== Operational missions ===
Ion thrusters are routinely used for station-keeping on commercial and military communication satellites in geosynchronous orbit. The Soviet Union pioneered this field, using stationary plasma thrusters (SPTs) on satellites starting in the early 1970s.

Two geostationary satellites (ESA's Artemis in 2001–2003 and the United States military's AEHF-1 in 2010–2012) used the ion thruster to change orbit after the chemical-propellant engine failed. Boeing began using ion thrusters for station-keeping in 1997 and planned in 2013–2014 to offer a variant on their 702 platform, with no chemical engine and ion thrusters for orbit raising; this permits a significantly lower launch mass for a given satellite capability. AEHF-2 used a chemical engine to raise perigee to 16,330 km (10,150 mi) and proceeded to geosynchronous orbit using electric propulsion.

==== In Earth orbit ====
===== Tiangong space station =====
China's Tiangong space station is fitted with ion thrusters. Its Tianhe core module is propelled by both chemical thrusters and four Hall-effect thrusters, which are used to adjust and maintain the station's orbit. The development of the Hall-effect thrusters is considered a sensitive topic in China, with scientists "working to improve the technology without attracting attention". Hall-effect thrusters are created with crewed mission safety in mind with effort to prevent erosion and damage caused by the accelerated ion particles. A magnetic field and specially designed ceramic shield was created to repel damaging particles and maintain integrity of the thrusters. According to the Chinese Academy of Sciences, the ion drive used on Tiangong has burned continuously for 8,240 hours without a glitch, indicating their suitability for the Chinese space station's designated 15-year lifespan. This is the world's first Hall thruster on a human-rated mission.

===== Starlink =====
SpaceX's Starlink satellite constellation uses Hall-effect thrusters powered by krypton or argon to raise orbit, perform maneuvers, and de-orbit at the end of their use.

===== GOCE =====
ESA's Gravity Field and Steady-State Ocean Circulation Explorer (GOCE) was launched on 16 March 2009. It used ion propulsion throughout its twenty-month mission to combat the air-drag it experienced in its low orbit (altitude of 255 kilometres) before intentionally deorbiting on 11 November 2013.

==== In deep space ====
===== Deep Space 1 =====
NASA developed the NSTAR ion engine for use in interplanetary science missions beginning in the late 1990s. It was space-tested in the space probe Deep Space 1, launched in 1998. This was the first use of electric propulsion as the interplanetary propulsion system on a science mission. Based on the NASA design criteria, Hughes Research Labs developed the Xenon Ion Propulsion System (XIPS) for performing station keeping on geosynchronous satellites. Hughes (EDD) manufactured the NSTAR thruster used on the spacecraft.

===== Hayabusa and Hayabusa2 =====
The Japanese Aerospace Exploration Agency's Hayabusa space probe was launched in 2003 and rendezvoused with the asteroid 25143 Itokawa. It was powered by four xenon ion engines, which used microwave electron cyclotron resonance to ionize the propellant and an erosion-resistant carbon/carbon-composite material for its acceleration grid. Although the ion engines on Hayabusa experienced technical difficulties, in-flight reconfiguration allowed one of the four engines to be repaired and allowed the mission to successfully return to Earth.

Hayabusa2, launched in 2014, was based on Hayabusa. It also used ion thrusters.

===== Smart 1 =====
The European Space Agency's satellite SMART-1 launched in 2003 using a Snecma PPS-1350-G Hall thruster to get from GTO to lunar orbit. This satellite completed its mission on 3 September 2006, in a controlled collision on the Moon's surface, after a trajectory deviation so scientists could see the 3-meter crater the impact created on the visible side of the Moon.

===== Dawn =====
Dawn launched on 27 September 2007, to explore the asteroid Vesta and the dwarf planet Ceres. It used three Deep Space 1 heritage xenon ion thrusters (firing one at a time). Dawn's ion drive is capable of accelerating from 0 to 97 km/h (60 mph) in 4 days of continuous firing. The mission ended on 1 November 2018, when the spacecraft ran out of hydrazine chemical propellant for its attitude thrusters.

==== LISA Pathfinder ====
LISA Pathfinder is an ESA spacecraft launched in 2015 to orbit the Sun-Earth L1 point. It does not use ion thrusters as its primary propulsion system, but uses both colloid thrusters and FEEP for precise attitude control – the low thrusts of these propulsion devices make it possible to move the spacecraft incremental distances accurately. It is a test for the LISA mission. The mission ended on 30 December 2017.

==== BepiColombo ====
ESA's BepiColombo mission was launched to Mercury on 20 October 2018. It uses ion thrusters in combination with swing-bys to get to Mercury, where a chemical rocket will complete orbit insertion.

==== Double Asteroid Redirection Test ====
NASA's Double Asteroid Redirection Test (DART) was launched in 2021 and operated its NEXT-C xenon ion thruster for about 1,000 hours to reach the target asteroid on 28 September 2022.

==== Psyche ====
NASA's Psyche spacecraft was launched in 2023 and is operating its SPT-140 xenon ion thruster in order to reach asteroid 16 Psyche in August 2029.

==== Tianwen-2 ====
CNSA's Tianwen-2 was launched in May 2025, to explore the co-orbital near-Earth asteroid 469219 Kamoʻoalewa and the active asteroid 311P/PanSTARRS and collecting samples of the regolith of Kamo'oalewa.

=== Proposed missions ===
==== MARS-CAT ====
The MARS-CAT (Mars Array of ionospheric Research Satellites using the CubeSat Ambipolar Thruster) mission is a two 6U CubeSat concept mission to study Mars' ionosphere. The mission would investigate its plasma and magnetic structure, including transient plasma structures, magnetic field structure, magnetic activity and correlation with solar wind drivers. The CAT thruster is now called the RF thruster and manufactured by Phase Four.

==== Interstellar missions ====
Geoffrey A. Landis proposed using an ion thruster powered by a space-based laser, in conjunction with a lightsail, to propel an interstellar probe.

=== Cancelled missions ===
==== International Space Station ====
As of March 2011, a future launch of an Ad Astra VF-200 200 kW VASIMR electromagnetic thruster was under consideration for testing on the International Space Station (ISS). However, in 2015, NASA ended plans for flying the VF-200 to the ISS. A NASA spokesperson stated that the ISS "was not an ideal demonstration platform for the desired performance level of the engines". Ad Astra stated that tests of a VASIMR thruster on the ISS would remain an option after a future in-space demonstration.

The VF-200 would have been a flight version of the VX-200. Since the available power from the ISS is less than 200 kW, the ISS VASIMR would have included a trickle-charged battery system allowing for 15 minutes pulses of thrust. The ISS orbits at a relatively low altitude and experiences fairly high levels of atmospheric drag, requiring periodic altitude boosts – a high-efficiency engine (high specific impulse) for station-keeping would be valuable; theoretically VASIMR reboosting could cut fuel cost from the current US$210 million annually to one-twentieth. VASIMR could in theory use as little as 300 kg of argon gas for ISS station-keeping instead of 7500 kg of chemical fuel – the high exhaust velocity (high specific impulse) would achieve the same acceleration with a smaller amount of propellant, compared to chemical propulsion with its lower exhaust velocity needing more fuel. Hydrogen is generated by the ISS as a by-product and is vented into space.

NASA previously worked on a 50 kW Hall-effect thruster for the ISS, but work was stopped in 2005.

==== Lunar Gateway ====
The Power and Propulsion Element (PPE) is a module on the Lunar Gateway that provides power generation and propulsion capabilities. It was planned to be launched on a Falcon Heavy no earlier than 2027. It would probably have used the 50 kW Advanced Electric Propulsion System (AEPS) under development at NASA Glenn Research Center and Aerojet Rocketdyne. However, NASA decided to cancel Gateway in 2026 and instead shifted its focus on the construction of a lunar surface base, leaving the future of the thruster uncertain.

== Popular culture ==
- The idea of an ion engine first appeared in Donald W. Horner's By Aeroplane to the Sun: Being the Adventures of a Daring Aviator and his Friends (1910).
- Ion propulsion is the main thrust source of the spaceship Kosmokrator in the East German/Polish science fiction film Der Schweigende Stern (1960). Minute 28:10.
- In the 1968 Star Trek episode "Spock's Brain", Scotty is repeatedly impressed by a civilization's use of ion power.
- The Imperial TIE Fighter spacecraft from the Star Wars franchise are propelled by twin ion engines, hence the name.
- Ion propulsion is used by the Hermes spacecraft in the Andy Weir novel The Martian to transfer crew between Earth and Mars.

== See also ==
- Advanced Electric Propulsion System
- Colloid thruster
- Comparison of orbital rocket engines
- Electrically powered spacecraft propulsion
- Ion-propelled aircraft
- List of spacecraft with electric propulsion
- Nano-particle field extraction thruster
- Nuclear electric rocket
- Nuclear pulse propulsion
- Plasma actuator
- Plasma propulsion engine
- Plasma speaker
- Spacecraft propulsion
