= NASA Solar Technology Application Readiness =

Space propulsion system, electrostatic gridded ion thruster

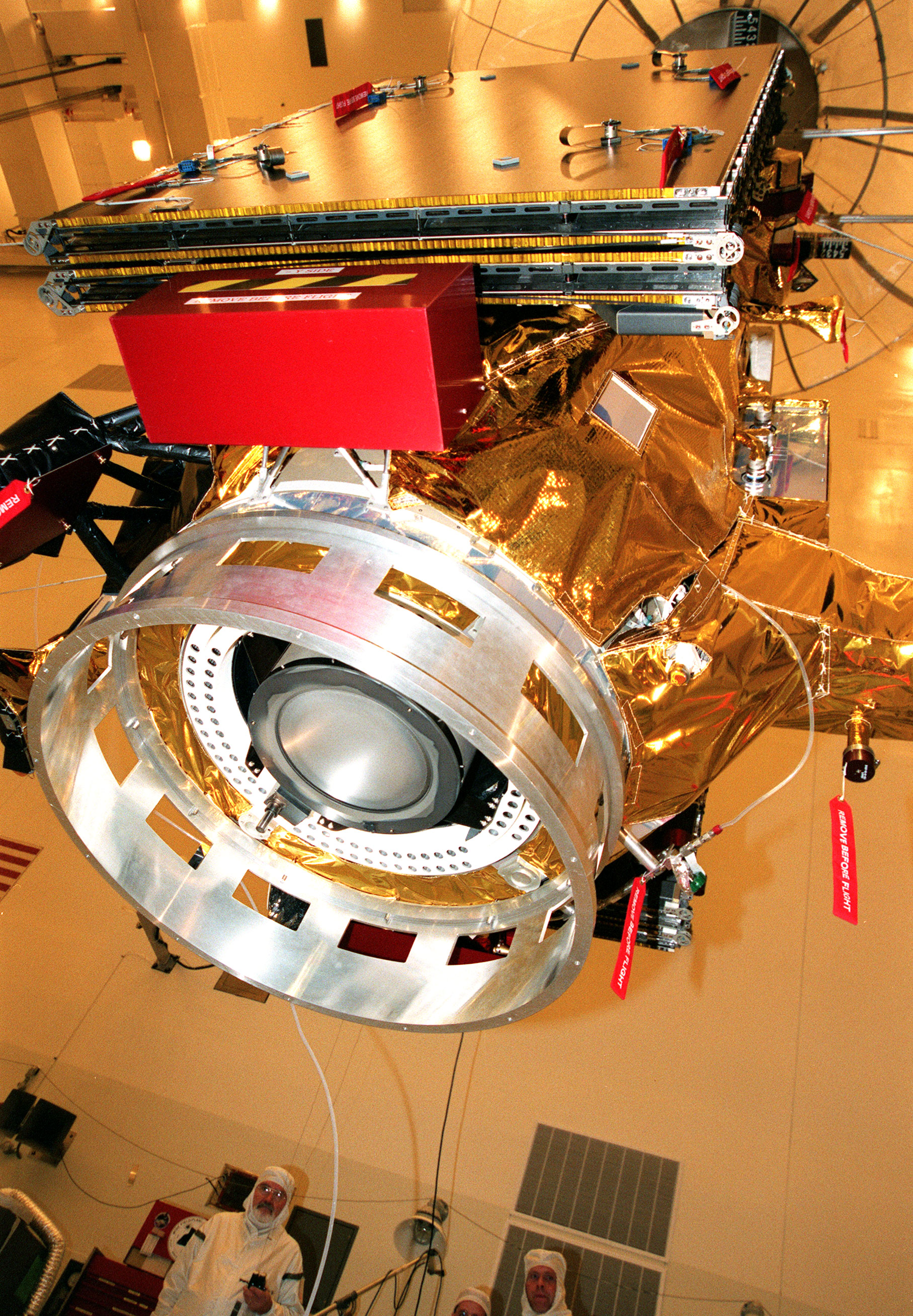
The Deep Space 1 and Dawn used the NSTAR, a solar-powered electrostatic ion propulsion engine

The NASA Solar Technology Application Readiness (NSTAR) is a type of spacecraft ion thruster called electrostatic ion thruster. It is a highly efficient low-thrust spacecraft propulsion running on electrical power generated by solar arrays. It uses high-voltage electrodes (including two fine grids) to accelerate ions with electrostatic forces.

== Development and performance ==
Diagram of a generic gridded electrostatic ion thruster

The purpose of NSTAR program was to develop a xenon-fueled ion propulsion system for deep space missions. The NSTAR electrostatic ion thruster was developed at NASA's Glenn Research Center and manufactured by Hughes, and Spectrum Astro, Inc. in the early 1990s. The feed system development was a collaborative effort between JPL and Moog Inc.

The ions are accelerated through two fine grids with roughly a 1300 V difference between them for 2.3 kW operation, with a thrust of 20-92 mN, a specific impulse of 19000-30500 N·s/kg (1950-3100 s) and a total impulse capability of 2.65 × 10^{6} Ns on DS1.

In 1996, the prototype engine endured 8000 hours of continuous operation in a vacuum chamber that simulates conditions of outer space. The results of the prototyping were used to define the design of flight hardware that was built for Deep Space 1 probe. One of the challenges was developing a compact and light weight power processing unit that converts power from the solar arrays into the voltages needed by the engine.

=== Performance ===
The engine achieves a specific impulse of up to three thousand seconds. This is an order of magnitude higher than traditional space propulsion methods, resulting in a mass savings of approximately half. Although the engine produces just 92 millinewtons (0.331 ounce-force) thrust at maximum power (2,100W on DS1 mission), the craft achieved high speed because ion engines thrust continuously for long periods of time. "The 30-cm ion thruster operates over a 0.5 kW to 2.3 kW input power range providing thrust from 19 mN to 92 mN. The specific impulse ranges from 1900 s at 0.5 kW to 3100 s at 2.3 kW."

== Applications ==
=== Deep Space ===
The NSTAR ion thruster was first used on the Deep Space 1 (DS1) spacecraft, launched on 24 October 1998. The Deep Space mission carried out a flyby of asteroid 9969 Braille and Comet Borrelly. Deep Space 1 had 178 pounds (81 kilograms) of xenon propellant, with a total impulse capability of 2.65 × 10^{6} Ns and was capable of increasing the speed of DS1 by 7900 miles per hour (12,700 kilometers per hour, 3.58 km/s) over the course of the mission. It used 2.3 kW of electrical power and was the primary propulsion for the probe.

=== Dawn ===
The second interplanetary mission using NSTAR engine was the Dawn spacecraft, launched in 2007 with three redundant units with a 30 cm diameter each. Dawn is the first NASA exploratory mission to use ion propulsion to enter and leave more than one orbit. Dawn carried 425 kg (937 lb) of on-board xenon propellant, and was able to perform a velocity change of 25,700 mph (11.49 km/s) over the mission.

=== Proposed uses ===
As of 2009 NASA engineers state that NSTAR engines, in the 5-kilowatt and 0.04 pound-thrust range, are candidates for propelling spacecraft to Europa, Pluto, and other small bodies in deep space.

== See also ==
- Electrically powered spacecraft propulsion
- NEXT (ion thruster) – Space propulsion system, a gridded electrostatic ion thruster
- Advanced Electric Propulsion System – Spacecraft propulsion system by NASA. 50kW Hall-effect thrusters, now for Lunar Gateway
