= Advanced Electric Propulsion System =

Spacecraft propulsion system

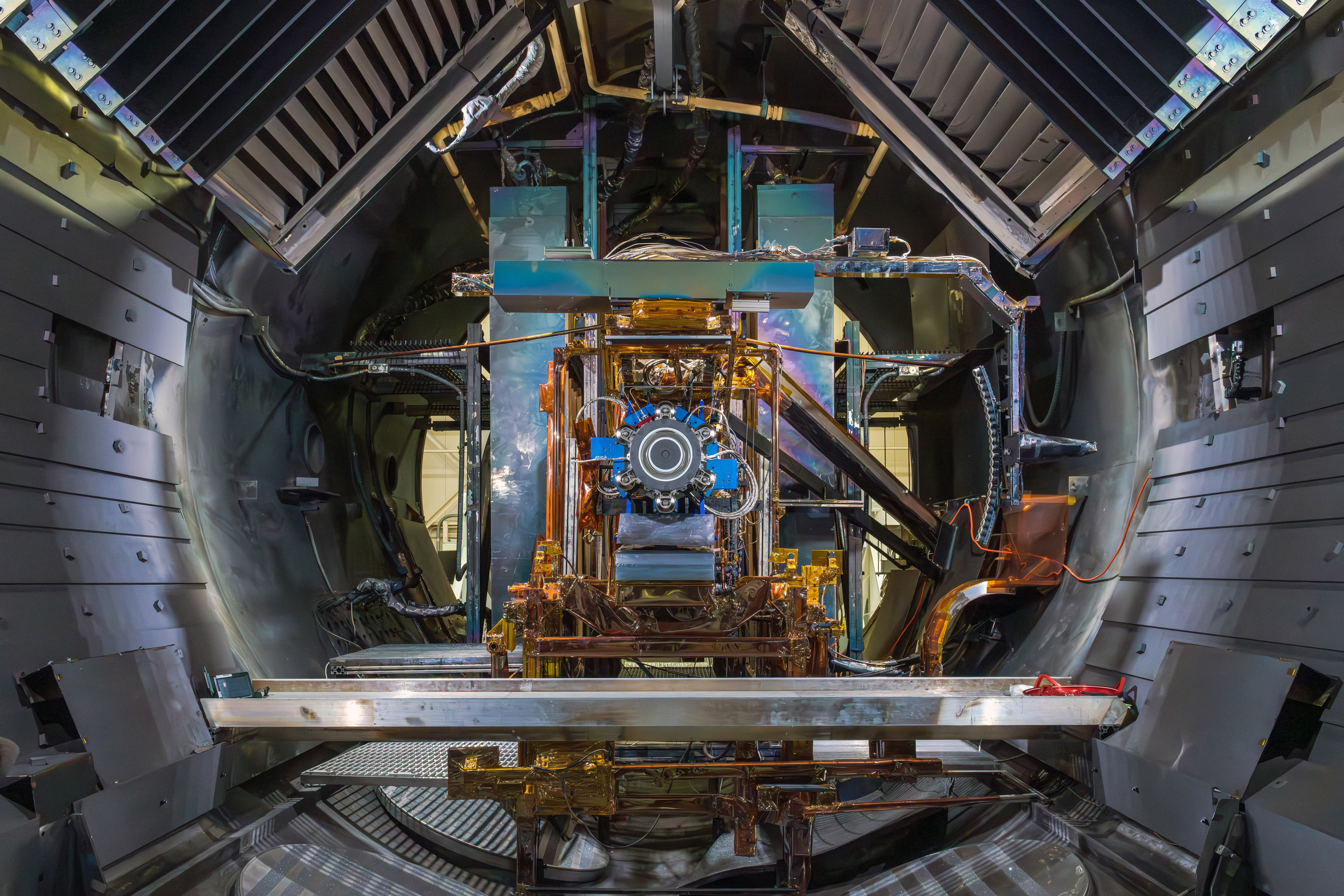
The Advanced Electric Propulsion System qualification thruster inside one of the vacuum chambers at NASA Glenn’s Electric Propulsion and Power Laboratory.

Advanced Electric Propulsion System (AEPS) is a solar electric propulsion system for spacecraft that is being designed, developed and tested by NASA and Aerojet Rocketdyne for large-scale science missions and cargo transportation. The first application of the AEPS is to propel the Power and Propulsion Element (PPE) of the currently paused Lunar Gateway, to be launched no earlier than 2027 originally. The PPE module is built by Maxar Space Systems in Palo Alto, California. Two identical AEPS engines would consume 25 kW being generated by the roll-out solar array (ROSA) assembly, which can produce over 60 kW of power.

The Power and Propulsion Element (PPE) for the Lunar Gateway will have a mass of 8-9 metric tons and will be capable of generating 50 kW of solar electric power for its Hall-effect thrusters for maneuverability, which can be supported by chemical monopropellant thrusters for high-thrust attitude control maneuvers.

The AEPS will serve as nuclear electric propulsion for Space Reactor-1 Freedom.

== Overview ==
Solar-electric propulsion has been shown to be reliable and efficient, and allows a significant mass reduction of spacecraft. High-power solar electric propulsion is a key technology that has been prioritized because of its significant exploration benefits in cis-lunar space and crewed missions to Mars.

The AEPS Hall thruster system was originally developed since 2015 by NASA Glenn Research Center and the Jet Propulsion Laboratory to be used on the now canceled Asteroid Redirect Mission. Work on the thruster did not stop following the mission cancellation in April 2017 because there is demand of such thrusters for a range of NASA, defense and commercial missions in deep space. Since May 2016, further work on AEPS has been transitioned to Aerojet Rocketdyne that is currently designing and testing the engineering-model hardware. This is a contract worth $65 million, where Aerojet Rocketdyne developed, qualified and will deliver five 12.5 kW Hall thruster subsystems, including thrusters, PPUs and xenon flow controllers.

== Design ==
AEPS	Performance
Max. power consumption	40 kW
Max. operating current	≤ 25 A
Voltage	Input: 95 V – 140V; Output: 300 V – 600 V
Max. specific impulse (I_{sp})	2,900 s
Max. thrust	600 mN /engine
Theoretical total thrust	2.356 N
Actual thrust @ 40 kW	1.77 N
Distance range from Sun	0.8 to 1.7 AU
System mass	100 kg × 4 engines
Xenon propellant mass (Lunar Gateway)	5,000 kg

AEPS is based on the 12.5 kW development model thruster called 'Hall Effect Rocket with Magnetic Shielding' (HERMeS). The AEPS solar electric engine makes use of the Hall-effect thruster in which the propellant is ionized and accelerated by an electric field to produce thrust. To generate 12.5 kW at the thruster actually takes a total of 13.3 kW including power needed for the control electronics. Four identical AEPS engines (thruster and control electronics) would theoretically need 4 × 13.3 kW = 53.2 kW, more than the 50 kW generated by solar panels of the PPE. It is stated that the AEPS array is intended only to use 40 kW of the 50 kW, so the maximum thrust would be limited to around 1.77 N.

The engineering model is undergoing various vibration tests, thruster dynamic and thermal environment tests in 2017. AEPS is expected to accumulate about 5,000 h by the end of the contract and the design aims to achieve a flight model that offers a half-life of at least 23,000 hours and a full life of about 50,000 hours.

The three main components of the AEPS propulsion engine are: a Hall-effect thruster, Power Processor Unit (PPU), and the Xenon Flow Controller (XFC). The thrusters are throttleable over an input power range of 6.67 – 40 kW with input voltages ranging from 95 to 140 V. The estimated xenon propellant mass for the Lunar Gateway would be 5,000 kg. The Preliminary Design Review took place in August 2017. It was concluded that "The Power Processing Unit successfully demonstrated stable operation of the propulsion system and responded appropriately to all of our planned contingency scenarios."

== Tests ==
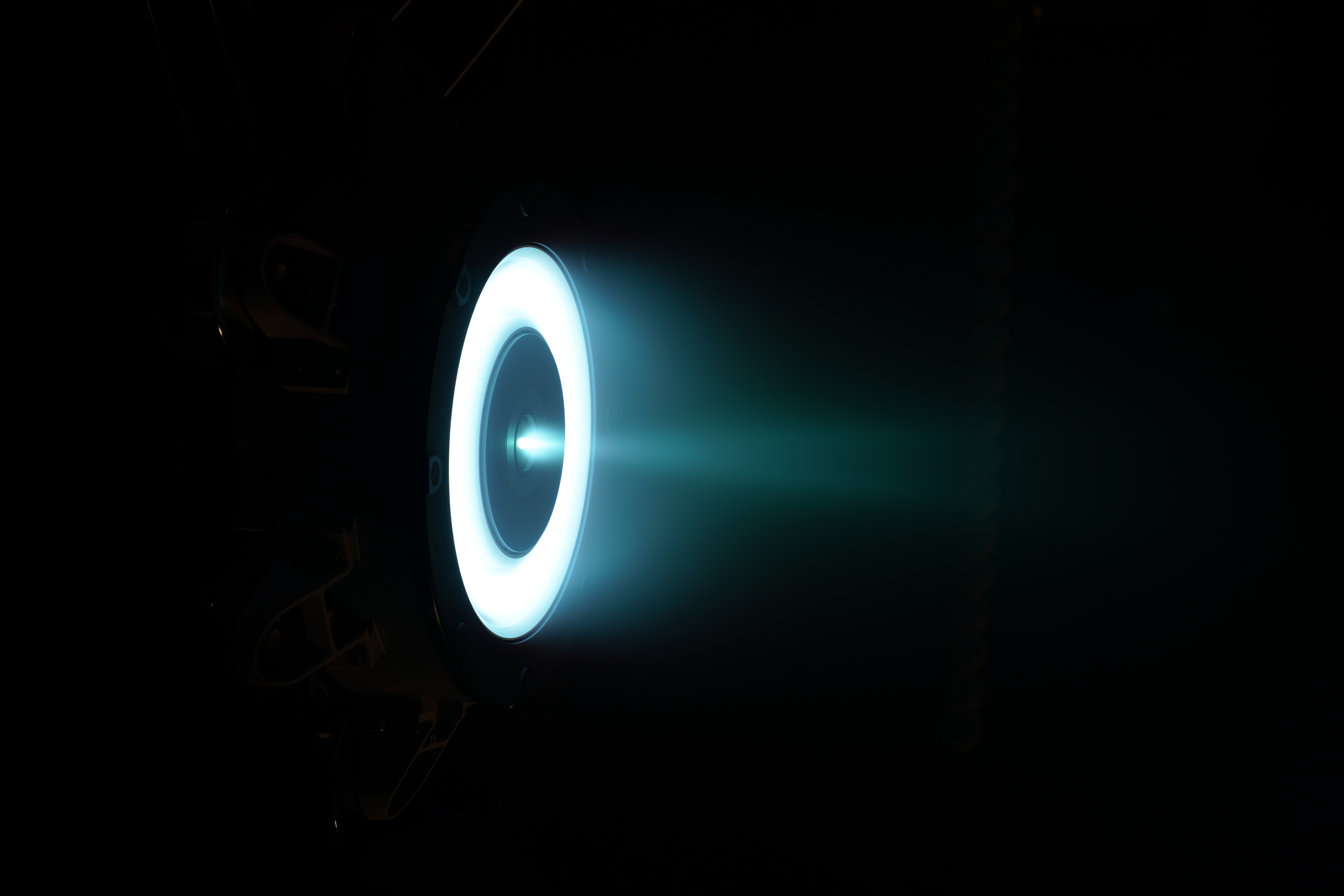
A view from inside the vacuum chamber showing the Advanced Electric Propulsion System fired up during qualification testing at NASA Glenn.

In July 2017, AEPS was tested at Glenn Research Center. The tests used a Power Processing Unit (PPU), which could also be used for other advanced spacecraft propulsion technology. In August 2018, Aerojet Rocketdyne completed the early systems integration test in a vacuum chamber, leading to the design finalization and verification phase. In November 2019, Aerojet Rocketdyne demonstrated the AEPS thruster at full power for the first time.

In July 2023, NASA and Aerojet Rocketdyne began qualification testing on AEPS.

== See also ==
- NASA Solar Technology Application Readiness – Space propulsion system, electrostatic gridded ion thruster
- VASIMR variable impulse electric plasma engine
