= Comet Lemmon (disambiguation) =

Comet Lemmon may refer to any comets below discovered by the Mount Lemmon Survey:

== Periodic comets ==
=== Encke-type comets ===
- 349P/Lemmon
- P/2023 JN16 (Lemmon)

=== Jupiter-family comets ===
- 363P/Lemmon
- 397P/Lemmon
- 405P/Lemmon
- 423P/Lemmon
- 507P/Lemmon
- P/2011 FR143 (Lemmon)
- P/2017 TW13 (Lemmon)
- P/2020 WJ5 (Lemmon)
- P/2022 BV9 (Lemmon)
- P/2026 V1 (Lemmon)

=== Halley-type comets ===
- C/2007 S2 (Lemmon)
- C/2012 BJ98 (Lemmon)
- P/2016 WM48 (Lemmon)
- C/2018 DO4 (Lemmon)
- C/2018 R5 (Lemmon)
- P/2021 TR81 (Lemmon)
- C/2022 Y2 (Lemmon)
- C/2023 S3 (Lemmon)

== Non-periodic comets ==
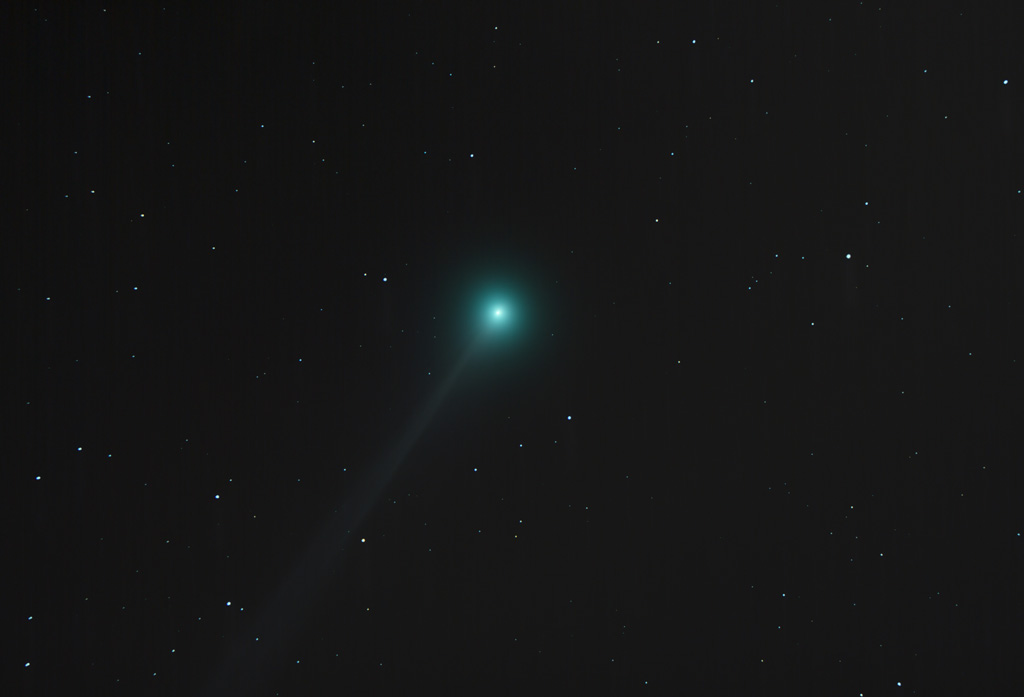
C/2012 F6

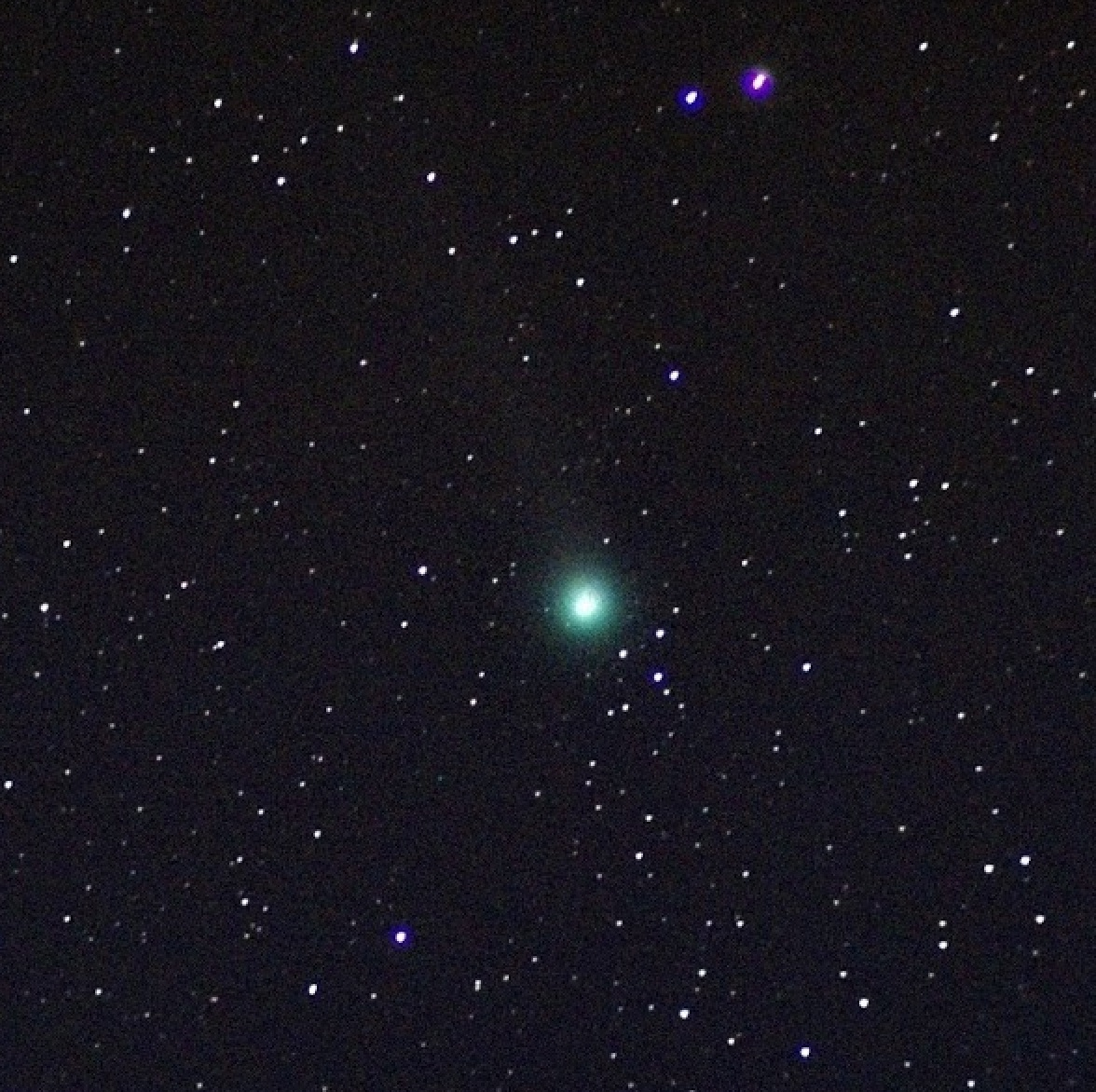
C/2019 U6

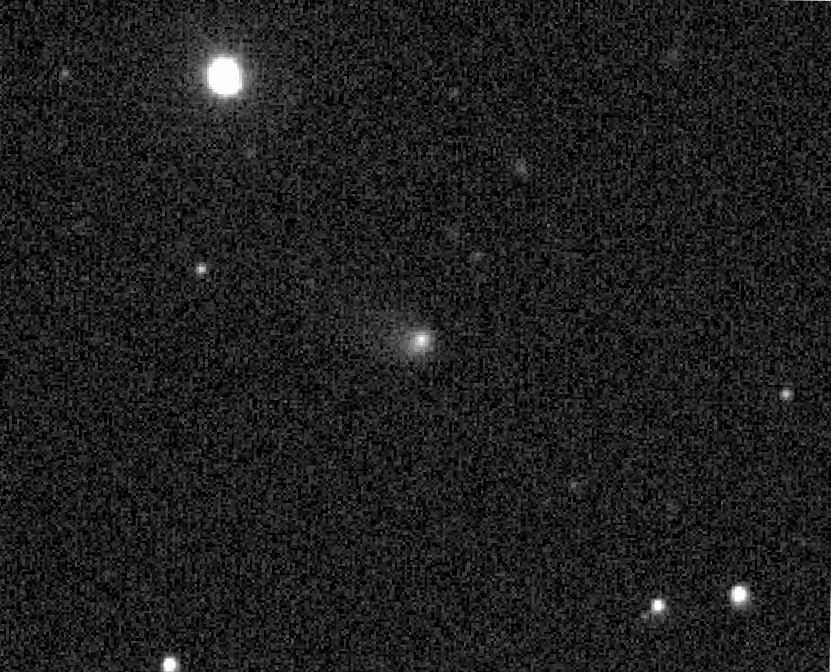
C/2021 T4

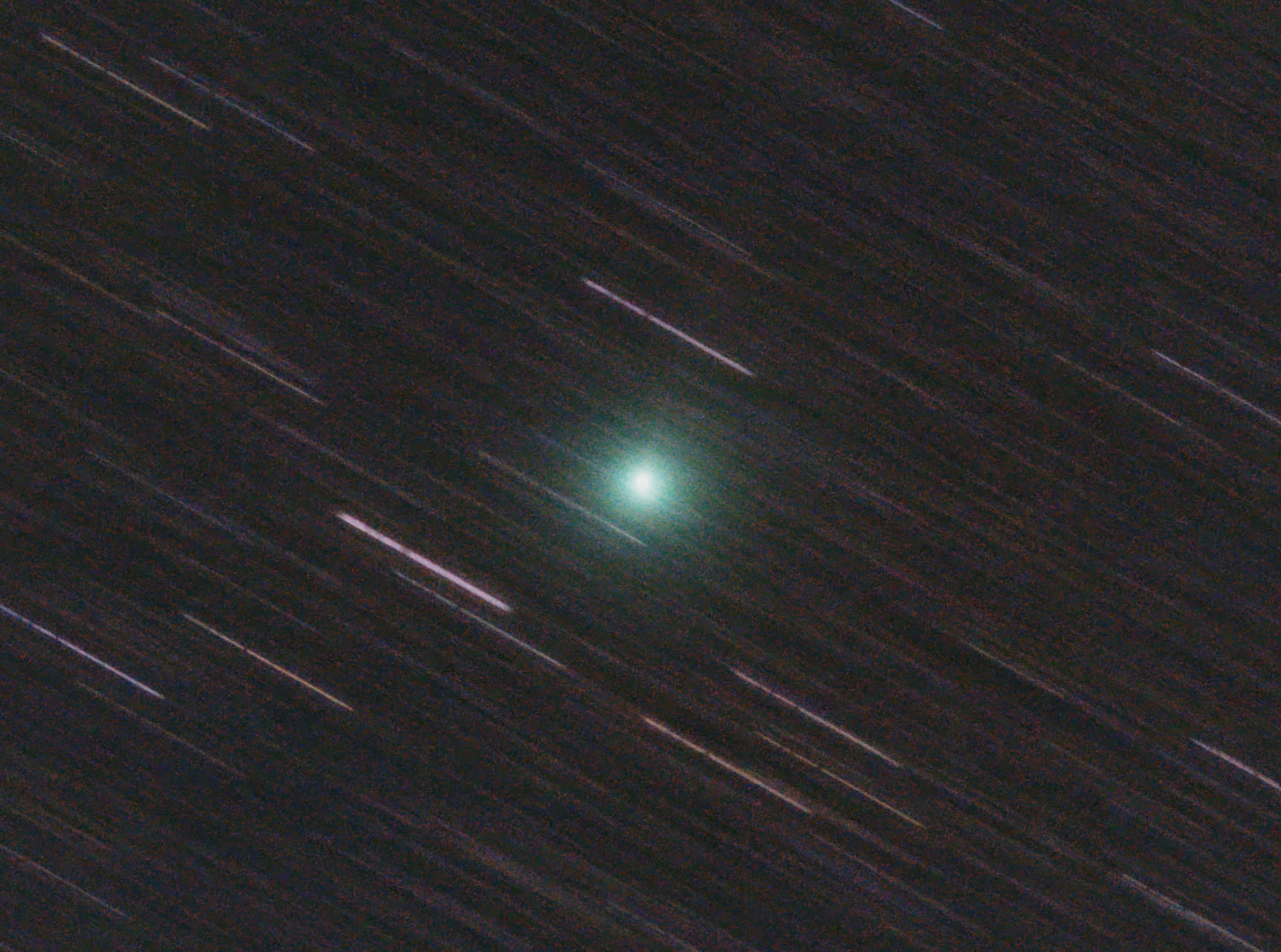
C/2023 H2

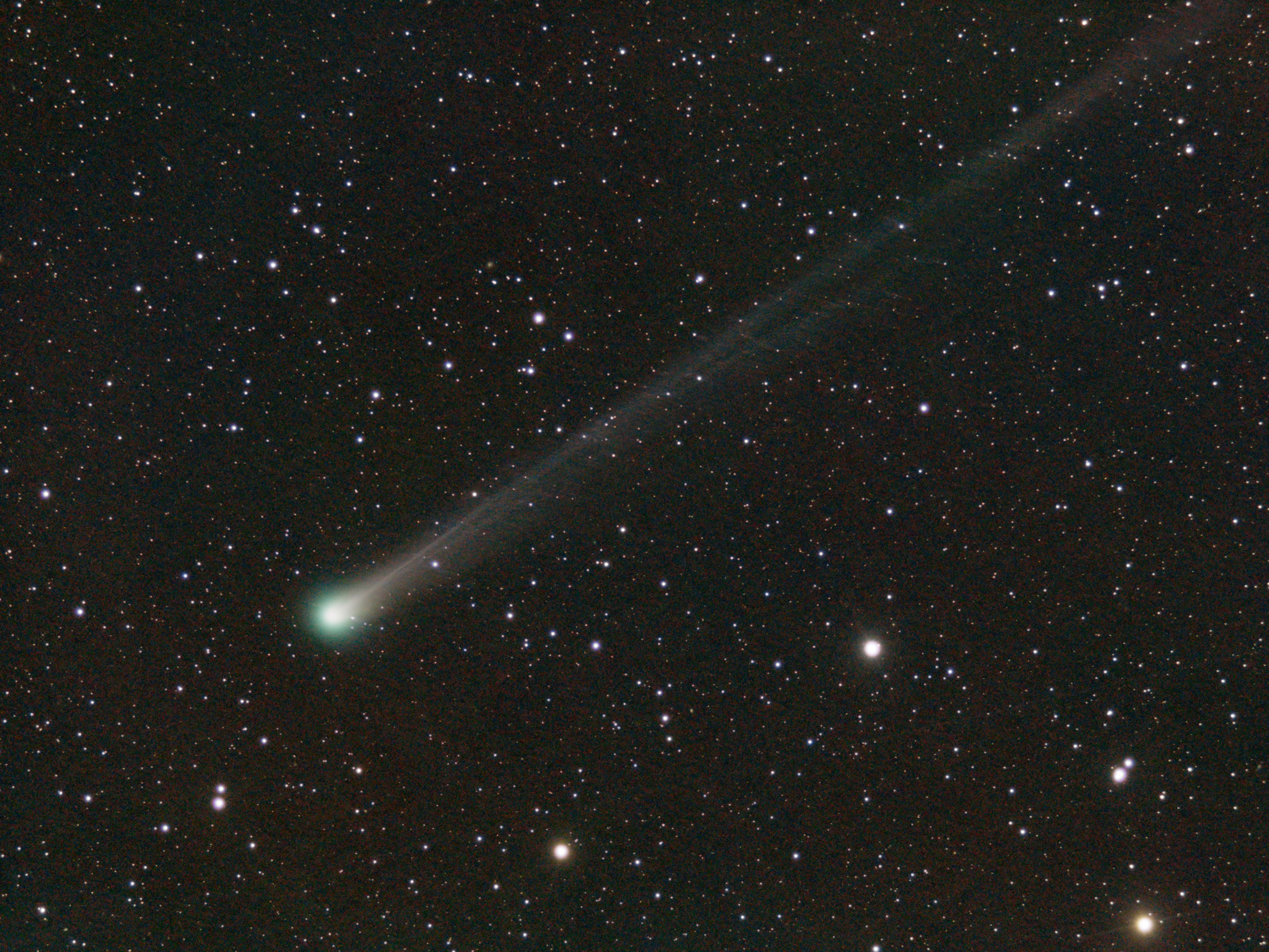
C/2025 A6

- C/2006 WD4 (Lemmon)
- C/2007 K1 (Lemmon)
- C/2012 F6 (Lemmon)
- C/2013 G6 (Lemmon)
- C/2016 X1 (Lemmon)
- C/2017 E5 (Lemmon)
- C/2018 EF9 (Lemmon)
- C/2018 KJ3 (Lemmon)
- C/2018 R3 (Lemmon)
- C/2019 J1 (Lemmon)
- C/2019 S4 (Lemmon)
- C/2019 T2 (Lemmon)
- C/2019 U6 (Lemmon)
- C/2020 B2 (Lemmon)
- C/2020 F7 (Lemmon)
- C/2020 H7 (Lemmon)
- C/2020 S8 (Lemmon)
- C/2020 T5 (Lemmon)
- C/2021 T1 (Lemmon)
- C/2021 T4 (Lemmon)
- C/2022 S4 (Lemmon)
- C/2022 T1 (Lemmon)
- C/2022 V2 (Lemmon)
- C/2023 H2 (Lemmon)
- C/2023 TD22 (Lemmon)
- C/2023 V1 (Lemmon)
- C/2024 B2 (Lemmon)
- C/2024 D1 (Lemmon)
- C/2024 J4 (Lemmon)
- C/2025 A6 (Lemmon)

== Hyperbolic comets ==
- C/2009 S3 (Lemmon)
- C/2009 UG89 (Lemmon)
- C/2012 K8 (Lemmon)
- C/2014 L5 (Lemmon)
- C/2015 XY1 (Lemmon)
- C/2017 F1 (Lemmon)
- C/2017 S7 (Lemmon)
- C/2018 B1 (Lemmon)
- C/2018 C2 (Lemmon)
- C/2018 U1 (Lemmon)
- C/2019 NJ3 (Lemmon)
- C/2019 Q1 (Lemmon)
- C/2020 W5 (Lemmon)
- C/2021 C6 (Lemmon)
- C/2023 H5 (Lemmon)
- C/2023 X2 (Lemmon)
- C/2024 B1 (Lemmon)
- C/2025 A1 (Lemmon)

== Others ==
"Comet Lemmon" may also be an incomplete reference to a comet co-discovered by the Mount Lemmon Survey. These include:

- Comet Lemmon–ATLAS
  - C/2022 A3 (Lemmon–ATLAS)
- Comet Lemmon–PanSTARRS
  - 302P/Lemmon–PanSTARRS
  - 445P/Lemmon–PanSTARRS
  - 457P/Lemmon–PanSTARRS
  - 481P/Lemmon–PanSTARRS
  - 514P/Lemmon–PanSTARRS
  - C/2014 W5 (Lemmon–PanSTARRS)
  - P/2015 B4 (Lemmon–PanSTARRS)
  - P/2015 D6 (Lemmon–PanSTARRS)
  - P/2019 A6 (Lemmon–PanSTARRS)
  - P/2020 K9 (Lemmon–PanSTARRS)
  - C/2021 F1 (Lemmon–PanSTARRS)
- Comet Lemmon–Read
  - P/2018 C1 (Lemmon–Read)
- Comet Lemmon–Siding Spring
  - C/2008 FK75 (Lemmon–Siding Spring)
- Comet Lemmon–Yeung–PanSTARRS
  - C/2015 VL62 (Lemmon–Yeung–PanSTARRS)
- Comet PanSTARRS–Lemmon
  - P/2020 A4 (PanSTARRS–Lemmon)
  - C/2020 H11 (PanSTARRS–Lemmon)
- Comet van Houten–Lemmon
  - 271P/van Houten–Lemmon
- Comet WISE–Lemmon
  - 453P/WISE–Lemmon
