= C/2018 F4 (PanSTARRS) =

Hyperbolic comet

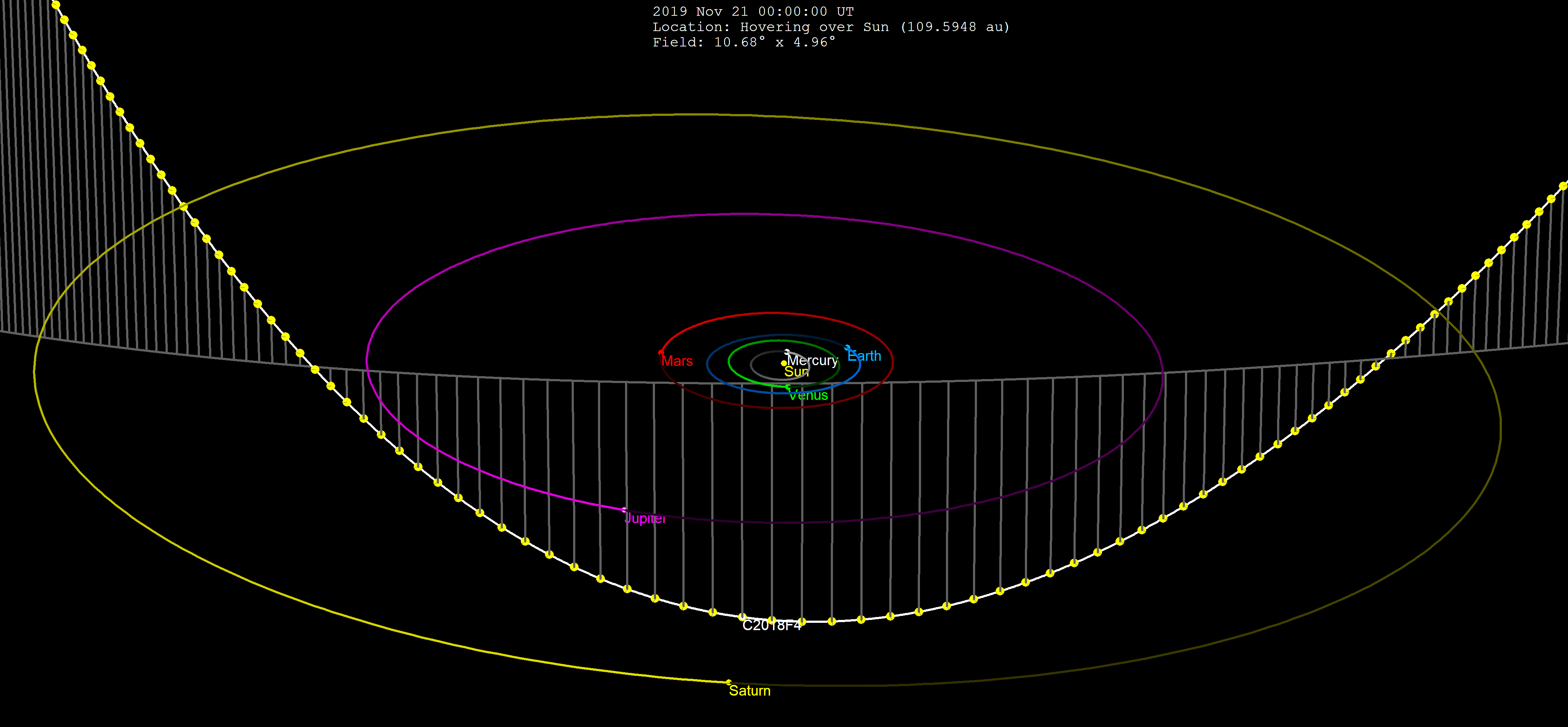
- Comet's trajectory through the Solar System, with 30-day motion markers

Discovery
- Discovered by: Pan-STARRS
- Discovery site: Haleakala Observatory
- Discovery date: 17 March 2018

Designations
- Minor planet category: hyperbolic comet

Orbital characteristics
- Epoch 20 September 2019 (JD 2458746.5)
- Observation arc: 1330 days(3.64 years)
- Perihelion: 3.43997 AU
- Eccentricity: 1.00152
- Inclination: 79.0989°
- Jupiter MOID: 0.596273 AU (89.2012 million km)

Physical characteristics
- Dimensions: ~0.1–10 km (0.062–6.214 mi)

C/2018 F4 (PanSTARRS) is a hyperbolic comet (previously classified as A/2018 F4, a hyperbolic asteroid). It was discovered on 17 March 2018 when it was beyond the orbit of Jupiter, 6.4 AU (960 million km) from the Sun. It was quite far from the Sun and turned out to simply be an asteroidal object that was discovered before cometary activity was noticeable. As perihelion (closest approach to the Sun) is inside the orbit of Jupiter, this object should become more active. In April 2018 it was determined to be a hyperbolic comet. Given that the incoming velocity was similar to that of an Oort cloud object, we can very confidently say that it is not of interstellar origin. C/2018 F4 fragmented around August 2020.

== Overview ==
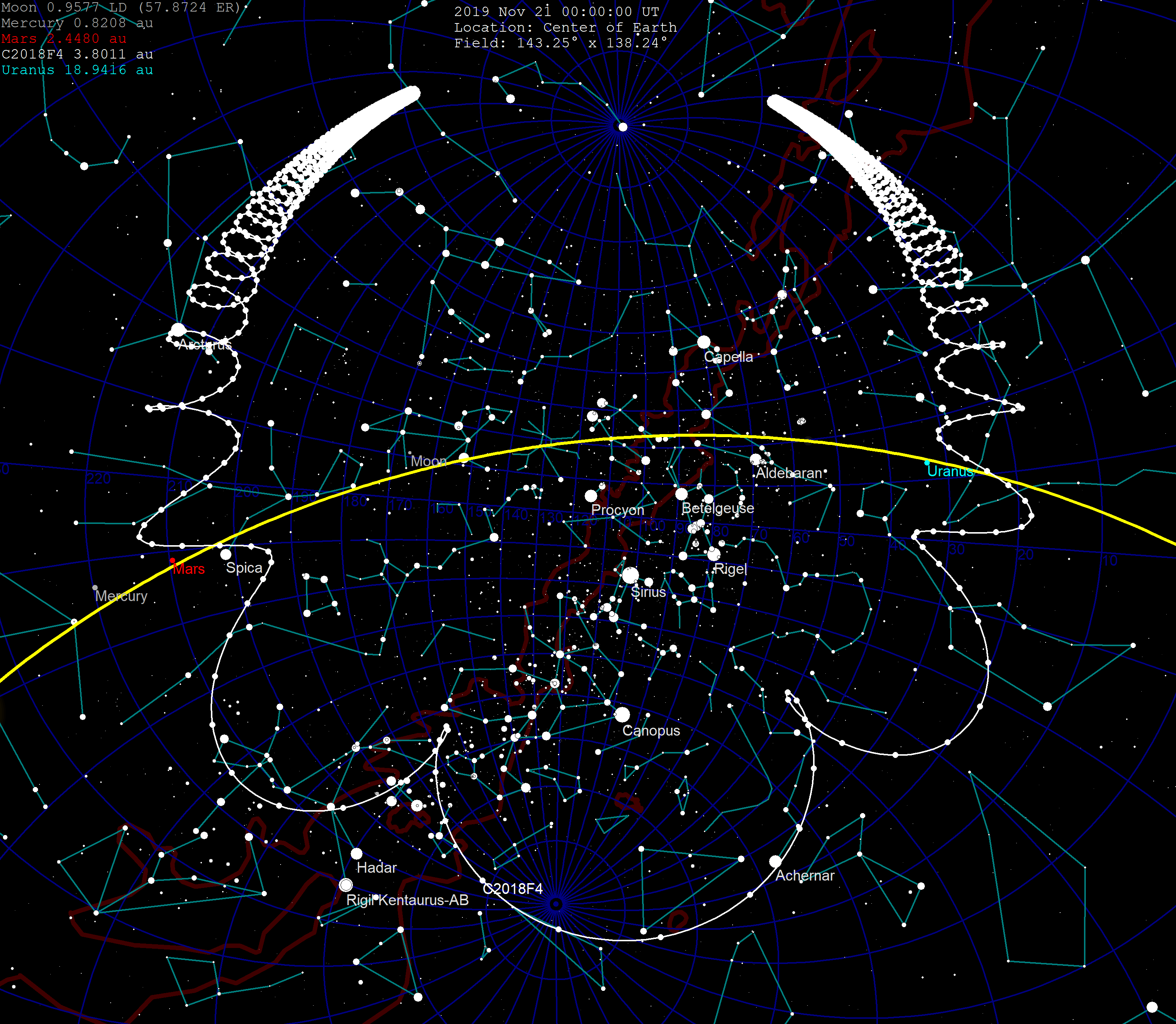
Path of comet across sky, with 30-day markers, visible over the south pole near perihelion

It would be no problem to fit a parabolic orbit to the C/2018 F4 data, (Note: C/2018 F4 could have an orbital eccentricity as low as 0.996. (Math: 1.0039-0.0072)) as used to be done for most short arc comets. The orbital eccentricity is decently constrained at 1.0038±0.0072, so it could even be a closed orbit with an eccentricity below 1. The velocity of the object currently has an uncertainty of ±0.2 km/s. With a common Oort cloud velocity of roughly 3 km/s (6,700 mph) when inbound 200 AU from the Sun, there is no reason to think 2018 F4 is of interstellar origin.

It will come to perihelion around 3 December 2019 when it will be 3.4 AU from the Sun.

Further observations will be necessary to determine if the orbit is hyperbolic. As a comet this object became known as C/2018 F4 (PANSTARRS).

The somewhat short observation arc of 35 days suggests that before entering the planetary region of the Solar System (epoch 1950), the comet had an orbital period on the order of a hundred thousand years. The heliocentric eccentricity became greater than 1 in November 2016 when the comet was 9.6 AU (1.44 billion km) from the Sun.

Inbound velocity at 200 AU from the Sun compared to Oort cloud objects
Object	Year	Velocity km/s	# of observations and obs arc
90377 Sedna	1746	1.99±0.00	196 in 9240 days
C/1980 E1 (Bowell)	1765	2.95±0.00	179 in 2514 days
C/1997 P2 (Spacewatch)	1779	2.96±0.01	94 in 49 days
C/2010 X1 (Elenin)	1798	2.96±0.00	2,222 in 235 days
C/2012 S1 (ISON)	1801	2.99±0.00	6,514 in 784 days
C/2008 J4 (McNaught)	1855	4.88±5.44	22 in 15 days
C/2018 F4	1792	2.74±0.03	402 in 967 days
C/1999 U2 (SOHO)	1947	17±447	41 in 1 day
1I/2017 U1 (ʻOumuamua)	1982	26.49±0.03	121 in 34 days

At 200 AU from the Sun, the escape velocity from the Sun is 2.98 km/s. In the above table, the only outlier is ʻOumuamua with a confident 34-day observation arc. Comet C/2008 J4 (McNaught) has a short observation arc with large uncertainties. Comet C/1999 U2 (SOHO) has a meaningless 1-day observation arc. Comet C/2018 F4 has a common Oort cloud velocity when 200 AU from the Sun.
