= Hyperbolic asteroid =

Astronomical object not orbiting the Sun

A hyperbolic asteroid is any sort of asteroid or non-cometary astronomical object observed to have an orbit not bound to the Sun and will have an orbital eccentricity greater than 1 when near perihelion. Unlike hyperbolic comets, they have not been seen out-gassing light elements, and therefore have no cometary coma. Most of these objects will only be weakly hyperbolic and will not be of interstellar origin.

== Orbit explanation ==
The planets and most satellites of the Solar System revolve in an almost circular motion – called an elliptical orbit – around the Sun or their parent planet, so their orbital eccentricity is generally much closer to 0 than to 1. In mathematics, by definition, an eccentricity (e) of 1 characterizes a parabola, and e > 1, a hyperbola. Some comets are on parabolic and hyperbolic orbits. This means that these hyperbolic asteroids all have an orbital eccentricity greater than 1.

== Known hyperbolic asteroids ==
So far most hyperbolic asteroids discovered have later displayed cometary behavior by either outgassing or demonstrating motion based on solar radiation pressure. Hyperbolic asteroids are orbital objects with an orbit not bound to the Sun while near perihelion. ʻOumuamua had the motion of a comet but was never seen outgassing and thus it is listed as a hyperbolic asteroid by the JPL Small-Body Database.

- Recent hyperbolic comets that were originally listed as hyperbolic asteroids include C/2017 U7 (A/2017 U7), C/2018 C2 (Lemmon), C/2018 F4 (PANSTARRS), C/2019 O3 (Palomar), and C/2019 G4.
- According to astronomer David Jewitt, it is likely that, as the Solar System moves toward the constellation Lyra, more hyperbolic asteroids will come into the view of astronomers as that is where ‘Oumuamua was observed coming from.

== Perturbation ==
Asteroids can become ejected or in a highly eccentric orbit around the Sun by being ejected by planets like Jupiter. Just because an orbit solution looks unbound at an epoch when the object is near perihelion (closest approach to the Sun) does not mean the orbit will be unbound when beyond the planets.

== See also ==
- ʻOumuamua, formerly designated a hyperbolic asteroid, but may be an exocomet instead.
- Hyperbolic comet, a Solar System comet with an eccentricity greater than 1.
- Interstellar object – Astronomical object not gravitationally bound to a star
