= Extrasolar object =

Any astronomical object that exists outside the Solar System

An extrasolar object (from Latin extra 'outside or beyond' and solaris 'of the Sun') is an astronomical object that exists outside the Solar System. It is not applied to stars, or any other celestial object that is larger than a star or the Solar System, such as a galaxy. The terms for extrasolar examples of Solar System bodies are:

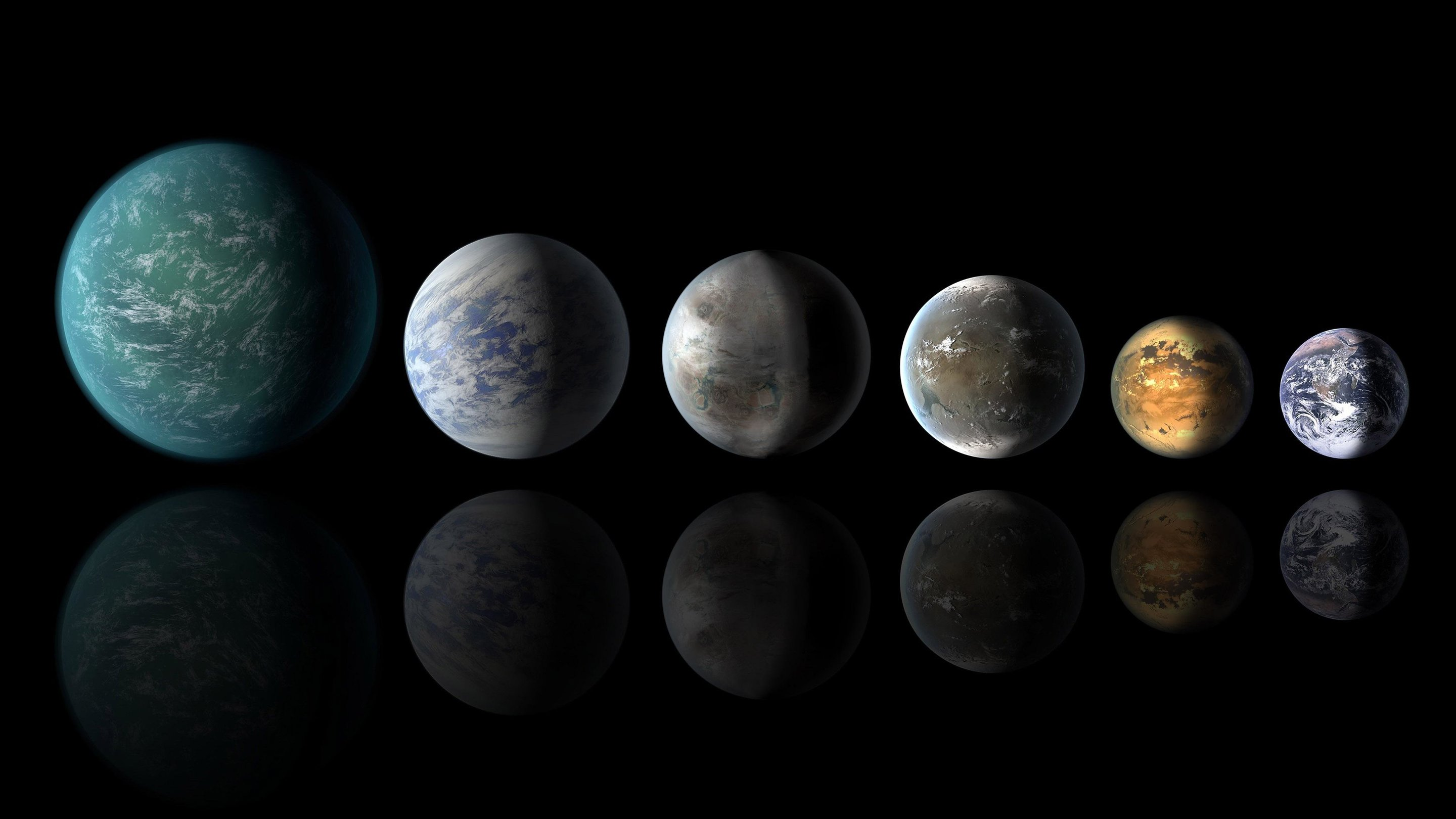

- Extrasolar planet, also called an "exoplanet"
- Extrasolar moon, also called an "exomoon"
- Exocomet, an extrasolar comet
- Exoasteroid, an extrasolar asteroid

Some Solar System object classes, such as minor planets, dwarf planets and Trans-Neptunian object equivalents have not been detected outside the Solar System. Several exocomets have passed near or through the solar system, and are called interstellar interlopers.

== See also ==
- Extraterrestrial, referring to objects or phenomena existing within the Solar System, but not on Earth
- Extragalactic astronomy, the study of objects outside the Milky Way Galaxy
- Interstellar object, an object that has traveled through interstellar space, such as ʻOumuamua, the first known example
- List of artificial objects leaving the Solar System
- Planetary system, a set of gravitationally bound non-stellar objects in orbit around a star or star system
- Substellar object – Astronomical object without the mass to sustain hydrogen fusion
