= C/2017 U7 (PanSTARRS) =

Hyperbolic comet

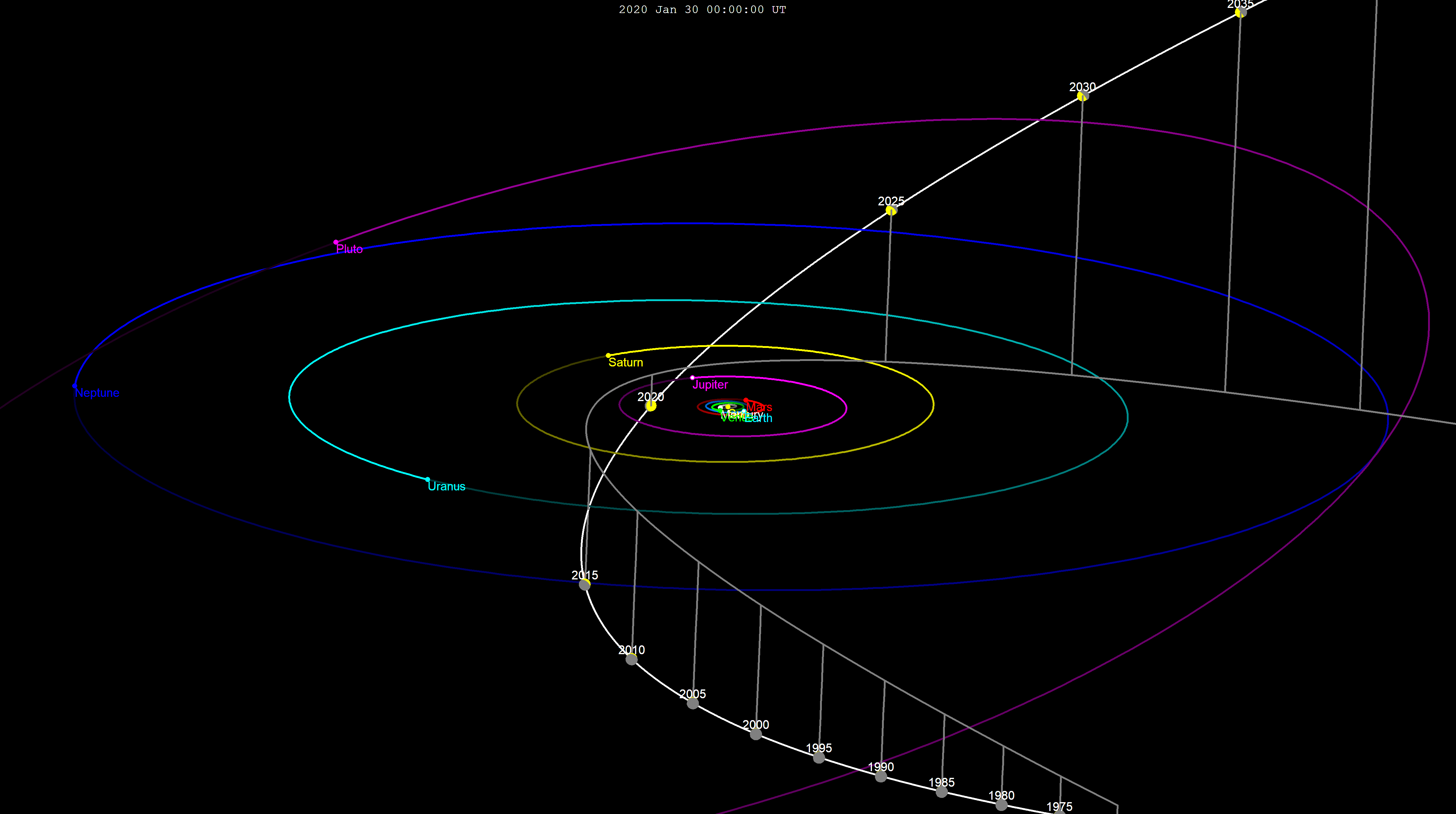
- The orbit of C/2017 U7 (PanSTARRS)

Discovery
- Discovered by: Pan-STARRS
- Discovery site: Haleakala Observatory
- Discovery date: 29 October 2017

Designations
- MPC designation: C/2017 U7, A/2017 U7
- Alternative designations: P10EwQh

Orbital characteristics
- Epoch: 8 January 2020 (JD 2458856.5)
- Observation arc: 176 days
- Earliest precovery date: 18 August 2017
- Perihelion: 6.418 AU
- Semi-major axis: ~9,500 AU (inbound)
- Eccentricity: 0.99932 (inbound); 1.00012 (outbound)
- Orbital period: ~920,000 years (inbound)
- Inclination: 142.64°
- Longitude of ascending node: 276.23°
- Argument of periapsis: 326.07°
- Last perihelion: 11 September 2019
- Earth MOID: 5.467 AU
- Jupiter MOID: 1.634 AU

Physical characteristics
- Mean radius: 22.5 km (14.0 mi)
- Geometric albedo: 0.04 (assumed)
- Comet total magnitude (M1): 6.1
- Apparent magnitude: 15.0 (2020 apparition)

C/2017 U7 (PanSTARRS) is a hyperbolic comet (previously classified as A/2017 U7, a hyperbolic asteroid), first observed on 29 October 2017 by astronomers of the Pan-STARRS facility at the Haleakala Observatory, Hawaii, United States when the object was 7.8 AU (1.2 billion km) from the Sun. Despite being discovered only 10 days after interstellar asteroid 1I/'Oumuamua, it was not announced until March 2018 (along with C/2018 C2 (Lemmon), which was believed to be another hyperbolic asteroid at the time) as its orbit is not strongly hyperbolic beyond most Oort Cloud comets. As of August 2018, there is only 1 hyperbolic asteroid known, 1I/ʻOumuamua, but hundreds of hyperbolic comets are found.

== Orbit ==
Although C/2017 U7's orbit is no longer bound to the Solar System, unlike ʻOumuamua, it is probably not an interstellar object. It had an inbound orbital period of roughly 800,000 years. Its point of origin is inclined only 3.5 degrees from the galactic plane, but its aphelion points roughly to the Galactic anticenter, so if it did somehow originate from interstellar space with a typical Solar System velocity (which is highly unlikely) it would have been traveling on an unusual orbit directly into the galactic core from beyond the Sun's orbit around the Milky Way.

A barycentric orbit of C/2017 U7, however, shows that it is only a very distant Solar System object, approaching as far as 16000±1000 AU from the Sun, around the distance of the Oort Cloud. It had an inbound orbital period of roughly 920,000 years until the current approach to the Solar System, where perturbations show it on an extremely weak hyperbolic trajectory after leaving the planetary region of the Solar System. The barycentric eccentricity increases above 1 starting with an epoch of July 2022, reaching 1.00012 once it gets beyond planetary perturbations.

As of March 2018, C/2017 U7 was inbound 7.4 AU (1.1 billion km) from the Sun. C/2017 U7 makes closest approach to the Sun on 10 September 2019 at a distance of 6.4 AU (outside of Jupiter's orbit). Due to the orbital inclination, on 18 May 2020, the asteroid will be about 1.66 AU (248,000,000 km; 154,000,000 mi) from Jupiter, generating a peak heliocentric eccentricity at 1.003. (Note: Soln.date: 2018-Mar-04: EC= 1.003046 (Heliocentric epoch 2020-May-19)) The dynamical analysis shows that the object has probably originated in the Oort cloud, however an interstellar origin cannot be discarded.

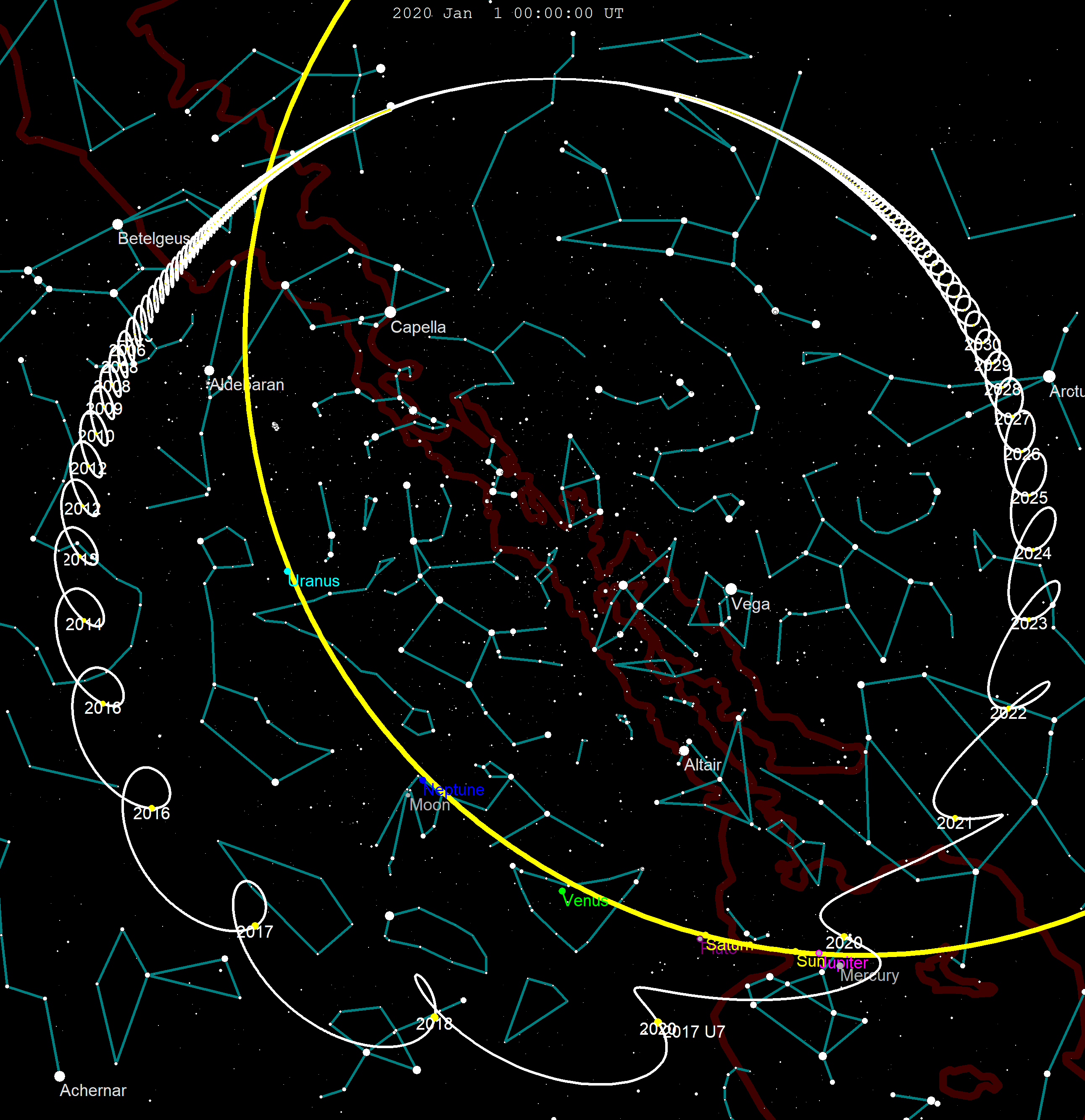
Path across sky

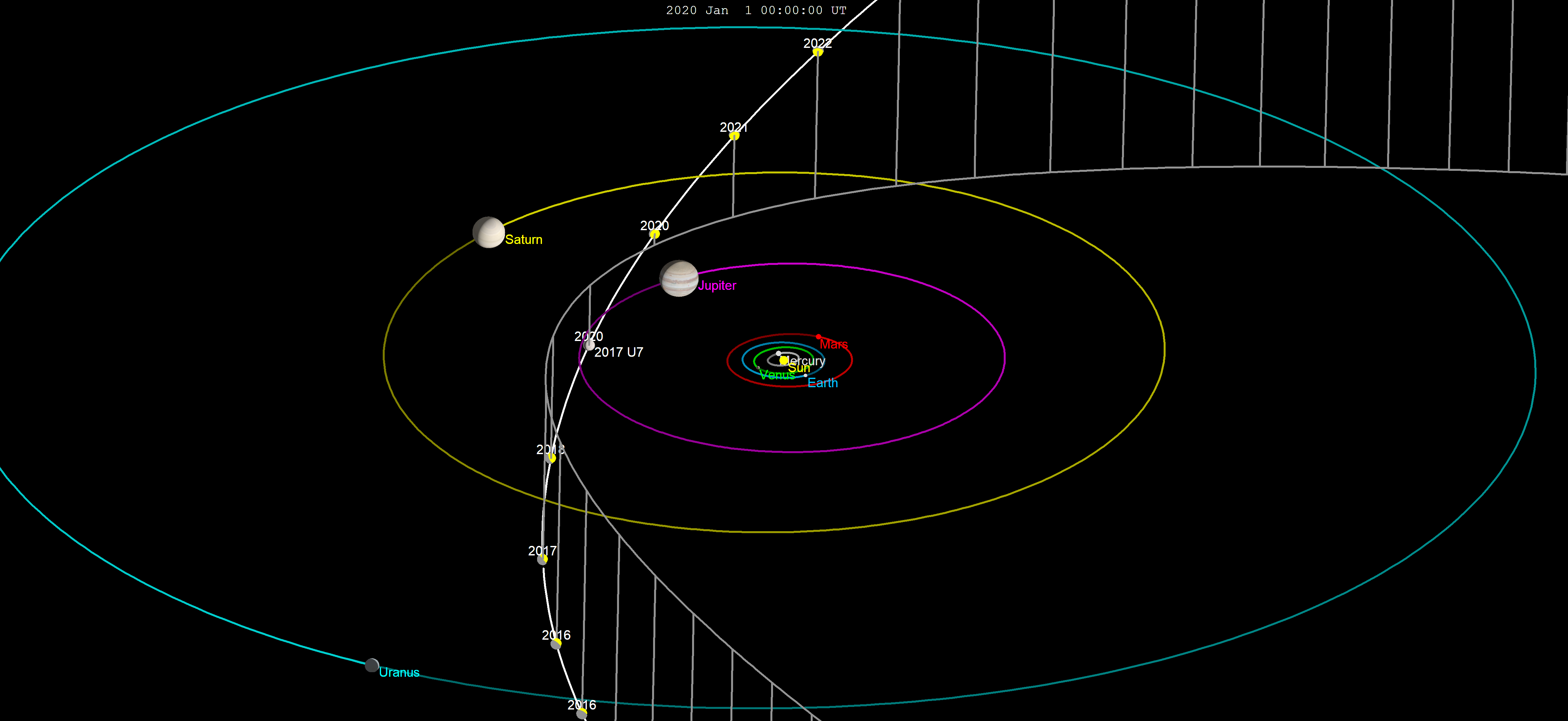
Hyperbolic trajectory through solar system

== Physical characteristics ==
The spectra and the colors of the hyperbolic comet C/2017 U7 (PanSTARRS) are atypical and the feature and overall spectral shape can be reproduced by laboratory spectra of kerite, a template for aliphatic-rich hydrocarbons that has been previously identified in NIR cometary spectra absorptions.

With an absolute magnitude of $\,H\, = (\;10.87 \pm\;0.13)$ corresponding to a nucleus diameter of 45 km (28 mi), this made C/2017 U7 as one of the largest comets ever known, assuming a geometric albedo of 0.04.
