= Kaʻiu Kimura =

Director of the ʻImiloa Astronomy Center of Hawaiʻi

- Born: 1978 or 1979 (age 47–48); Waimea, Hawaii County, Hawaii
- Education: University of Hawaiʻi at Hilo
- Occupation: Science educator
- Employer: ʻImiloa Astronomy Center

Leslie Kaʻiu Kimura is a Hawaiian science educator. Since 2010 she has been the executive director of the ʻImiloa Astronomy Center, working to teach visitors about traditional Hawaiian culture and astronomy.

== Early life and education ==
Kaʻiu Kimura was born in Waimea. She is a yonsei (fourth-generation Japanese) whose grandfather, agronomist Hisao Kimura and Hawaiian grandmother, Elizabeth Lindsey, had "a great romance," bringing together two well-known clans. Kimura grew up with influences from both cultures and exposure to both spoken Hawaiian and Japanese.

In seventh grade, Kimura attended the Kamehameha Schools Kapālama campus on Oʻahu as a boarding student. As an undergraduate at the University of Hawaiʻi at Hilo, she studied abroad at the University of Waikato in New Zealand and was inspired by learning of Māori people's efforts to preserve their culture and rights. While she was a graduate student at UH Hilo, she was asked to collaborate on the ʻImiloa project, then called the Mauna Kea Astronomy Education Center, as a research assistant. She received her master's degree in Hawaiian language and literature. In 2013 she began working in a Ph.D. program at UH Hilo focusing on Indigenous language revitalization.

== Career ==
Kimura and her uncle, Hawaiian language expert Larry Kimura, created much of the Hawaiian cultural content on display at the ʻImiloa Astronomy Center. She has worked to educate Hawaiians and people in other countries about the Mauna Kea Observatories, including discussing the controversy over further development on Mauna Kea. Kimura worked multiple positions at ʻImiloa, including as experience coordinator and as associate director, before being promoted to executive director in 2010. In her role as executive director, she has pursued an agenda of collaboration in encouraging research as well as education about Indigenous worldviews in science.

In 2017 she and Larry Kimura collaborated to give a Hawaiian name to the first observed interstellar asteroid ʻOumuamua. Two years later, she announced a project including specialists in Hawaiian culture and astronomy aiming to use Hawaiian words to describe astronomical objects. The collaborative project, led by the ʻImiloa Astronomy Center, is called A Hua He Inoa, a Hawaiian phrase describing the practice of calling forth a name, and is designed to create connection to the discoveries facilitated by observatories in Hawaiʻi.

== Recognition ==
Kimura was chosen as a Pacific Century Fellow for the class of 2009. In 2020, she was named one of the 20 for the Next 20 by Hawaii Business magazine.
