= C/2024 L5 (ATLAS) =

Possibly hyperbolic comet

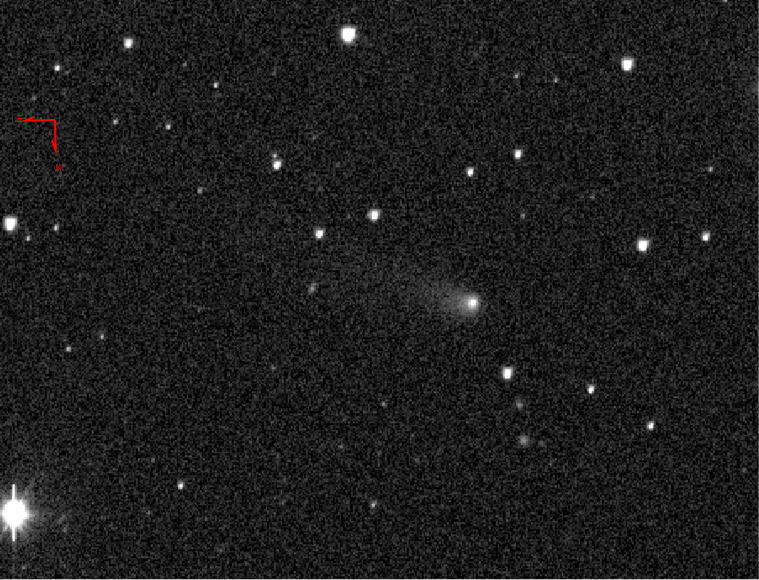
- Comet C/2024 L5 (ATLAS) on 16 April 2025

Discovery
- Discovered by: L. Denneau; R. Siverd; J. Tonry; H. Weiland
- Discovery site: ATLAS South Africa
- Discovery date: 14 June 2024

Designations
- Alternative designations: A117uUD

Orbital characteristics
- Epoch: 8 Feb 2025 (JD 2460714.5)
- Observation arc: 405 days (1.11 years)
- Number of observations: 1011
- Orbit type: Hyperbolic
- Perihelion: 3.4324 AU
- Eccentricity: 1.03736
- Inclination: 166.573°
- Longitude of ascending node: 139.175°
- Argument of periapsis: 290.513°
- Last perihelion: 10 March 2025
- Earth MOID: 2.46252 AU
- Jupiter MOID: 0.00572 AU
- Comet total magnitude (M1): 4.5

C/2024 L5 (ATLAS) is a comet that was discovered on 14 June 2024 as A117uUD by the Asteroid Terrestrial-impact Last Alert System (ATLAS), South Africa, Sutherland. It reached perihelion on 10 March 2025 at 3.432 AU (513.4 million km) from the Sun.

It is the second known Solar System comet to become interstellar after experiencing a planetary encounter. C/1980 E1 (Bowell) reached a hyperbolic trajectory after an encounter with Jupiter on 9 December 1980. C/2024 L5 experienced a very close encounter at 0.0048 astronomical units (720,000 km; 450,000 mi) with Saturn on 24 January 2022. C/2024 L5 could be a former retrograde, inactive centaur. The receding velocity of C/2024 L5 when entering interstellar space will be 2.8 km/s, moving towards the constellation of Triangulum.

== Orbit ==
JPL Horizons shows an outbound eccentricity greater than 1 so it will leave the Solar System eventually as C/1980 E1 (Bowell) is doing, but prior to its flyby to Saturn its eccentricity was 0.88.

== See also ==
- List of Solar System objects by greatest aphelion
- List of hyperbolic comets
