= 457P/Lemmon–PanSTARRS =

Main-belt comet

Discovery
- Discovered by: Pan-STARRS; Mount Lemmon Survey
- Discovery date: 19–20 July 2020

Designations
- MPC designation: P/2016 N7; P/2020 O1

Orbital characteristics
- Epoch: 21 November 2025 (JD 2461000.5)
- Observation arc: 9.13 years (Note: Observation arc from the Minor Planet Center database covering dates from 19 April 2015 until 6 June 2024.)
- Earliest precovery date: 19 April 2015
- Number of observations: 132
- Aphelion: 2.958 AU
- Perihelion: 2.332 AU
- Semi-major axis: 2.645 AU
- Eccentricity: 0.11831
- Orbital period: 4.302 years
- Inclination: 5.226°
- Longitude of ascending node: 175.96°
- Argument of periapsis: 104.29°
- Mean anomaly: 104.95°
- Last perihelion: 20 August 2024
- Next perihelion: ~2028
- T_{Jupiter}: 3.376
- Earth MOID: 1.319 AU
- Jupiter MOID: 2.171 AU

Physical characteristics
- Mean radius: 0.560 ± 0.060 km (0.348 ± 0.037 mi)
- Synodic rotation period: ~1.67 hours
- Geometric albedo: 0.05 (assumed)
- Absolute magnitude (H): 18.96±0.06
- Comet total magnitude (M1): 6.8

457P/Lemmon–PanSTARRS is an active asteroid in the middle main asteroid belt. It exhibits intermittent activity near perihelion, with a faint dusty tail and coma.

== Discovery and observation ==
457P/Lemmon–PanSTARRS was independently discovered twice in July 2020. Robert Weryk found the object in three images taken by the Pan-STARRS1 telescope at Haleakalā Observatory on 20 July, reporting a coma and a visible comet-like tail. Near-simultaneously, Kacper Wierzchoś discovered and reported the object using images taken on 19 July from Mount Lemmon Observatory, noting no cometary characteristics. The object was given the comet provisional designation P/2020 O1. In 2023, prediscovery observations from Subaru Telescope in 2016 were linked to 457P; these observations also showed cometary activity. It received its numerical designation (457P) in January 2024 alongside sixteen other short-period comets.

== Orbit ==
457P/Lemmon–PanSTARRS orbits the Sun on an elliptical orbit with an average distance – or semi-major axis – of 2.65 astronomical units, placing it in the middle main asteroid belt. Due to its orbital eccentricity of 0.12, its distance from the Sun ranges from 2.33 AU at perihelion to 2.96 AU at aphelion. It has an orbital inclination of 5.2° with respect to the ecliptic plane. Its orbit is asteroid-like, classifying it as a main-belt comet (MBC).

457P is likely a member of the Astraea family, an asteroid family whose namesake and largest member is the S-type asteroid 5 Astraea. Estimates of the Astraea family's age range from 190 million years to over 400 million years. A small subgroup of 31 asteroids are associated with 457P.

== Characteristics ==
Based on an absolute magnitude of 18.96 and an assumed geometric albedo of 0.05, the nucleus of 457P has an effective radius of 560 m. Photometric observations tentatively show a rapid rotation, with a double-peaked period of around 1.67 hours.

=== Activity ===
457P shows intermittent activity around perihelion, Its narrow tail is aligned strongly in the antisolar direction, suggesting dust is ejected at low velocities and swept away by radiation pressure. Its tail is likely composed of dust particles about 1 mm in size or less, with estimated peak production rates of 0.9 kilograms per second.

Despite 457P's activity showing characteristics of sublimation-driven activity, such as activity peaking around its perihelion passages, its tail appears to hold a low amount of volatile compounds such as water. Centrifugal ejection, helped by 457P's potentially rapid rotation, may be the source of its activity. Thermal stresses as its surface warms near perihelion could provide a steady reservoir of dust without the need for sublimating ices.

== Notes ==
Numbered comets
Previous; 456P/PanSTARRS	457P/Lemmon–PanSTARRS	Next; 458P/Jahn
