= C/2021 T4 (Lemmon) =

Non-periodic comet

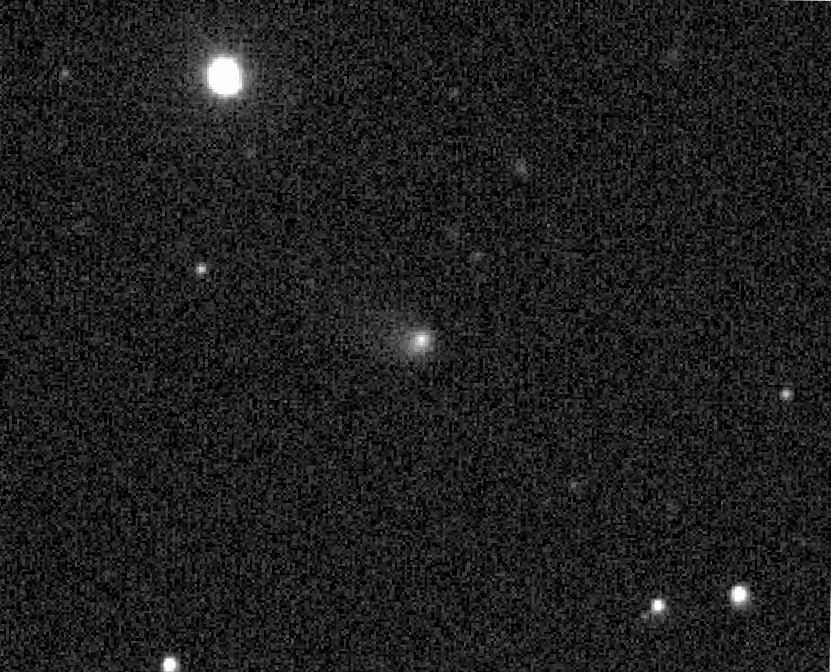
- Comet C/2021 T4 (Lemmon) photographed by the Zwicky Transient Facility on 21 December 2022

Discovery
- Discovered by: E. Bryssinck
- Discovery site: Mount Lemmon Survey
- Discovery date: 7 October 2021

Designations
- Alternative designations: CK21T040, C6131F2

Orbital characteristics
- Epoch: 14 April 2023 (JD 2460048.5)
- Observation arc: 3.63 years
- Earliest precovery date: 7 August 2021
- Number of observations: 2,107
- Aphelion: ≈44,000 AU (inbound) ≈2,200 AU (outbound)
- Perihelion: 1.483 AU
- Semi-major axis: ~18,130 AU
- Eccentricity: 0.99992
- Orbital period: millions of years (inbound) ≈36,000 years (outbound)
- Inclination: 160.78°
- Longitude of ascending node: 257.88°
- Argument of periapsis: 329.81°
- Mean anomaly: 359.99°
- Last perihelion: 31 July 2023
- T_{Jupiter}: –1.426
- Earth MOID: 0.498 AU
- Jupiter MOID: 0.869 AU

Physical characteristics
- Mean radius: 1.875 km (1.165 mi)
- Comet total magnitude (M1): 12.4
- Apparent magnitude: 8.0 (2023 apparition)

C/2021 T4 (Lemmon) is a non-periodic comet discovered by the Mount Lemmon Survey on 7 October 2021. Its current passage through the planetary region of the Solar System will reduce the orbital period from millions of years to thousands of years.

It has been south of the celestial equator since October 2022. On 13 June, it was 1.5 degrees from the star Beta Ceti. Closest approach to Earth was on 20 July 2023 at a distance of 0.54 AU (81 million km). The next day it reached its southernmost declination, at -56 degrees. On 25 July, it passed next to the globular cluster NGC 6397. It reached perihelion on 31 July 2023 at a distance of 1.48 AU (221 million km). The comet brightened to around apparent magnitude 8 at its peak.
