= Robert Weryk =

Canadian astronomer

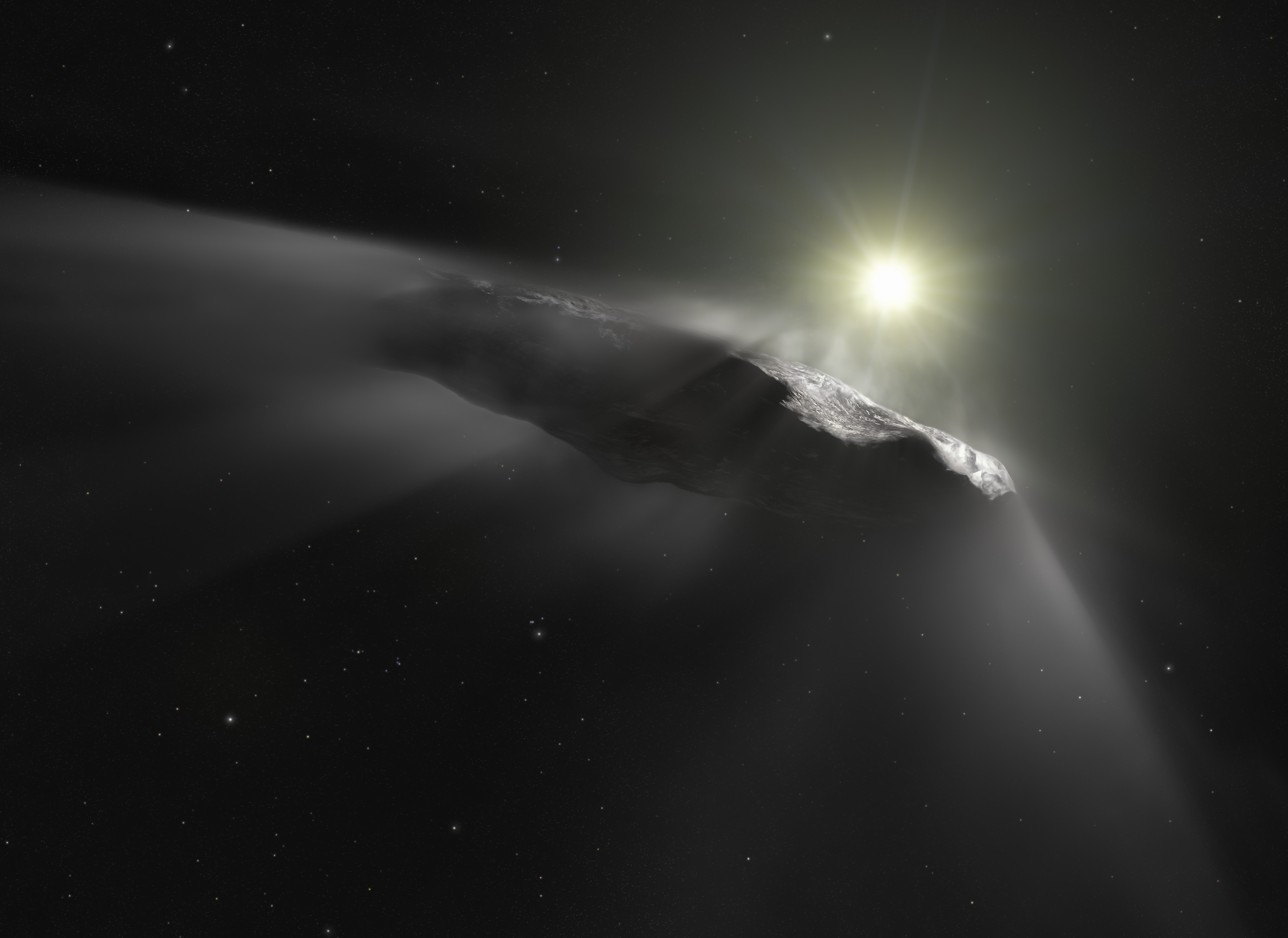
Artist’s impression of the interstellar object ʻOumuamua.

Robert J. Weryk (born 1981) is a Canadian physicist and astronomer. He currently works at the University of Hawaiʻi at Mānoa, where he discovered the first known interstellar object, ʻOumuamua. He has also published numerous articles on meteors and other astronomical topics.
