= 1I/ʻOumuamua =

Interstellar object that passed near Earth in 2017

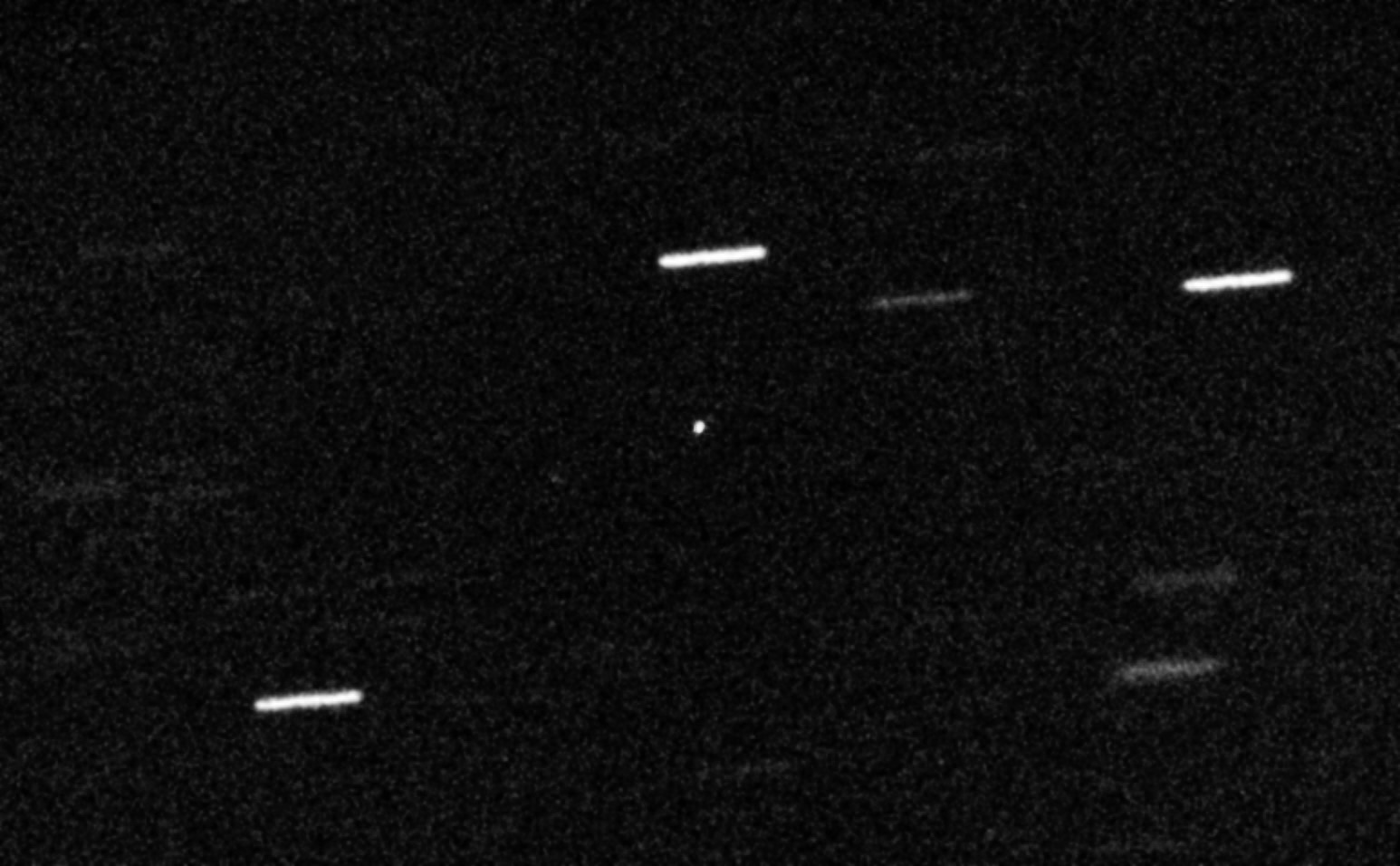
- ʻOumuamua on 28 October 2017 (Note: 5-minute exposure taken by the William Herschel Telescope on 28 October; ʻOumuamua appears as a light source in the center of the image, while background stars appear streaked due to the speed of ʻOumuamua as the telescope tracked it.)

Discovery
- Discovered by: Robert Weryk using Pan-STARRS 1
- Discovery site: Haleakalā Obs., Hawaii
- Discovery date: 19 October 2017

Designations
- Pronunciation: /oʊˌmuːəˈmuːə/, Hawaiian: [ʔowˈmuwəˈmuwə]
- Named after: Hawaiian term for scout
- Alternative designations: 1I; 1I/ʻOumuamua; 1I/2017 U1 (ʻOumuamua); A/2017 U1; C/2017 U1; P10Ee5V
- Minor planet category: Interstellar object; Hyperbolic asteroid

Orbital characteristics
- Epoch 23 November 2017 (JD 2458080.5)
- Observation arc: 80 days
- Perihelion: 0.255916±0.000007 AU
- Semi-major axis: −1.2723±0.0001 AU (Note: Objects on hyperbolic trajectories have negative semimajor axis, giving them a positive orbital energy.)
- Eccentricity: 1.20113±0.00002
- Average orbital speed: 26.33±0.01 km/s (interstellar); 5.55 AU/year
- Mean anomaly: 51.158°
- Mean motion: 0° 41^{m} 12.12^{s} / day
- Inclination: 122.74°
- Longitude of ascending node: 24.597°
- Time of perihelion: 9 September 2017 (87.71 km/s)
- Argument of perihelion: 241.811°
- Earth MOID: 0.0958 AU; 37.3 LD
- Jupiter MOID: 1.454 AU

Physical characteristics
- Dimensions: 115 m × 111 m × 19 m; 100–1000 m long; 230 m × 35 m × 35 m (est. at albedo 0.10)
- Synodic rotation period: Tumbling (non-principal axis rotation); Reported values include: 8.10±0.02 h; 8.10±0.42 h; 6.96+1.45 −0.39 h
- Geometric albedo: 0.1 (spectral est.); 0.06–0.08 (spectral est.)
- Spectral type: B–V = 0.7±0.06; V-R = 0.45±0.05; g-r = 0.47±0.04; r-i = 0.36±0.16; r-J = 1.20±0.11
- Apparent magnitude: 19.7 to >27.5 (Note: Range at which the object was expected to be observable. Brightness peaked at 19.7 mag on 18 October 2017, and faded below 27.5 mag (the limit of Hubble Space Telescope for fast-moving objects) around 1 January 2018. By late 2019, it should have dimmed to 34 mag.)
- Absolute magnitude (H): 22.08±0.45

1I/ʻOumuamua is the first confirmed interstellar object detected passing through the Solar System. Formally designated 1I/2017 U1, it was discovered by Canadian physicist Robert Weryk using the Pan-STARRS telescope at Haleakalā Observatory, Hawaii, on 19 October 2017, approximately 40 days after it passed its closest point to the Sun on 9 September. When it was first observed, it was about 33 million km (21 million mi; 0.22 AU) from Earth (about 85 times as far away as the Moon) and already heading away from the Sun.

ʻOumuamua is a small object estimated to be between 100 and 1,000 metres (300 and 3,000 ft) long, with its width and thickness both estimated between 35 and 167 metres (115 and 548 ft). It has a red color, like objects in the outer Solar System. Despite its close approach to the Sun, it showed no signs of having a coma, the usual nebula around comets formed when they pass near the Sun. Further, it exhibited non‑gravitational acceleration, potentially due to outgassing or a push from solar radiation pressure. It has a rotation rate similar to the Solar System's asteroids, but many valid models permit it to be unusually more elongated than all but a few other natural bodies observed in the solar system. This feature raised speculation about its origin. Its light curve, assuming little systematic error, presents its motion as "tumbling" rather than "spinning", and moving sufficiently fast relative to the Sun that it is likely of extrasolar origin. Extrapolated and without further deceleration, its path cannot be captured into a solar orbit, so it will eventually leave the Solar System and continue into interstellar space. Its planetary system of origin and age are unknown.

ʻOumuamua is remarkable for its extrasolar origin, high obliqueness, and observed acceleration without an apparent coma. By July 2019, most astronomers concluded that it was a natural object, but its precise characterization is contentious given the limited time window for observation. While an unconsolidated object (rubble pile) would require ʻOumuamua to be of a density similar to rocky asteroids, a small amount of internal strength similar to icy comets would allow it to have a relatively low density. Proposed explanations of its origin include the remnant of a disintegrated rogue comet, or a piece of an exoplanet rich in nitrogen ice, similar to Pluto. On 22 March 2023, astronomers proposed the observed acceleration was "due to the release of entrapped molecular hydrogen that formed through energetic processing of an H_{2}O-rich icy body", consistent with ʻOumuamua being an interstellar comet, "originating as a planetesimal relic broadly similar to solar system comets".

== Name ==
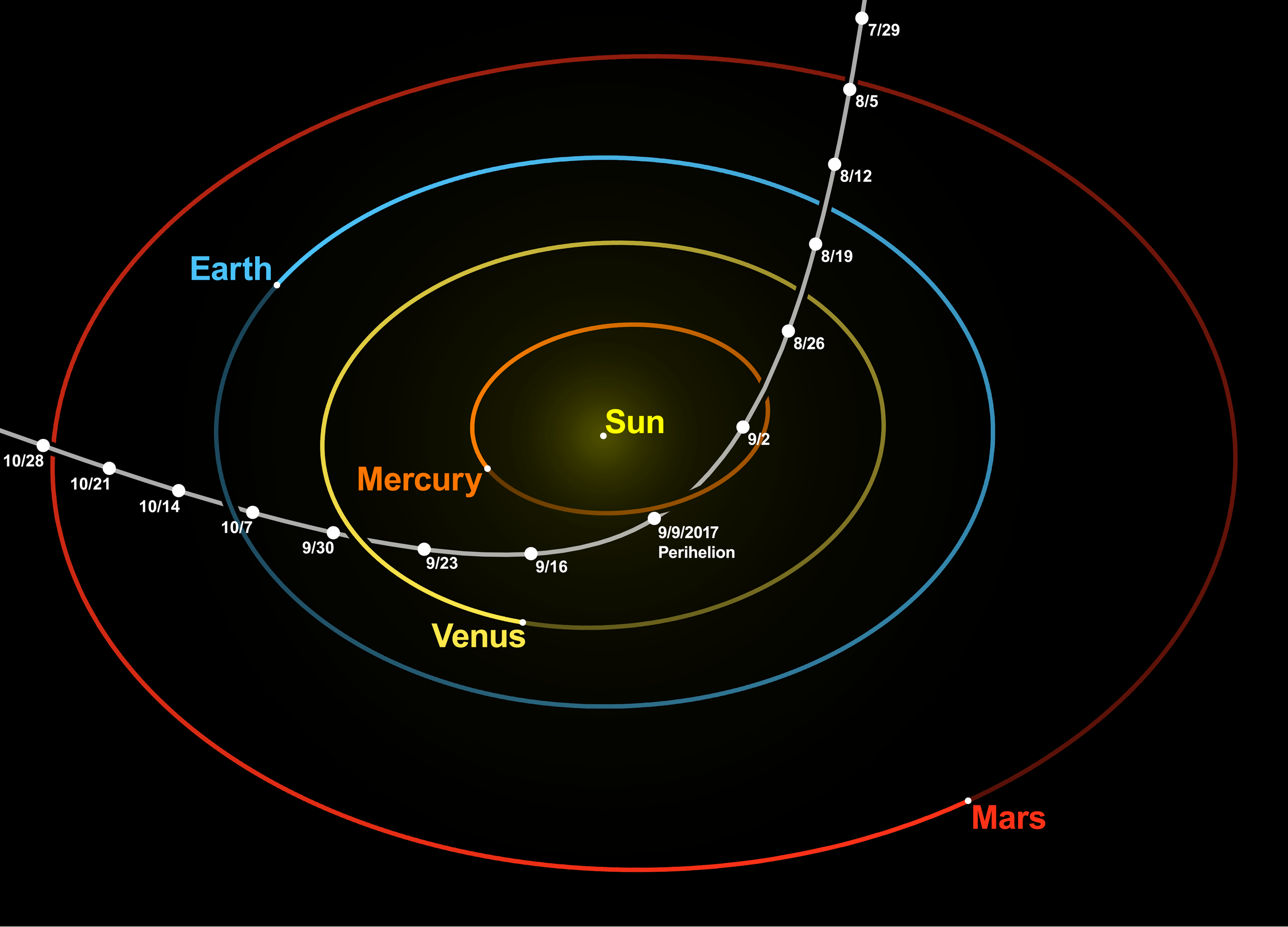
Hyperbolic trajectory of ʻOumuamua, during 2017, through the inner Solar System with the Sun at the focus

As the first known object of its type, ʻOumuamua presented a unique case for the International Astronomical Union, which assigns designations for astronomical objects. Originally classified as comet C/2017 U1, it was later reclassified as asteroid A/2017 U1 due to the absence of a coma. Once it was unambiguously identified as coming from outside the Solar System, a new designation was created: I, for Interstellar object. As the first object so identified, ʻOumuamua was designated 1I, with rules for the eligibility of objects for I-numbers and the names to be assigned to these interstellar objects yet to be codified. The object may be called 1I; 1I/2017 U1; 1I/ʻOumuamua; or 1I/2017 U1 (ʻOumuamua).

The name comes from Hawaiian ʻoumuamua 'scout' (from ʻou 'reach out for' and mua, reduplicated for emphasis 'first, in advance of'), and reflects the way the object is like a scout or messenger sent from the distant past to reach out to humanity. It roughly translates to 'first distant messenger'. The first character (not a diacritic) is a Hawaiian ʻokina, not an apostrophe, and is pronounced as a glottal stop; the Pan-STARRS team chose the name in consultation with Kaʻiu Kimura and Larry Kimura of the University of Hawaiʻi at Hilo.

Before the official name was decided, Rama was suggested, the name given to an alien spacecraft discovered under similar circumstances in the 1973 science fiction novel Rendezvous with Rama by Arthur C. Clarke.

== Observations ==
Observations and conclusions concerning ʻOumuamua's trajectory were primarily obtained with data from the Pan-STARRS1 Telescope, part of the Spaceguard Survey, and the Canada–France–Hawaii Telescope (CFHT), and its composition and shape from the Very Large Telescope and the Gemini South telescope in Chile, and the Keck II telescope in Hawaii. These were collected by Karen J. Meech, Robert Weryk, and their colleagues and published in Nature on 20 November 2017. After the announcement, the space-based telescopes Hubble and Spitzer joined in the observations.

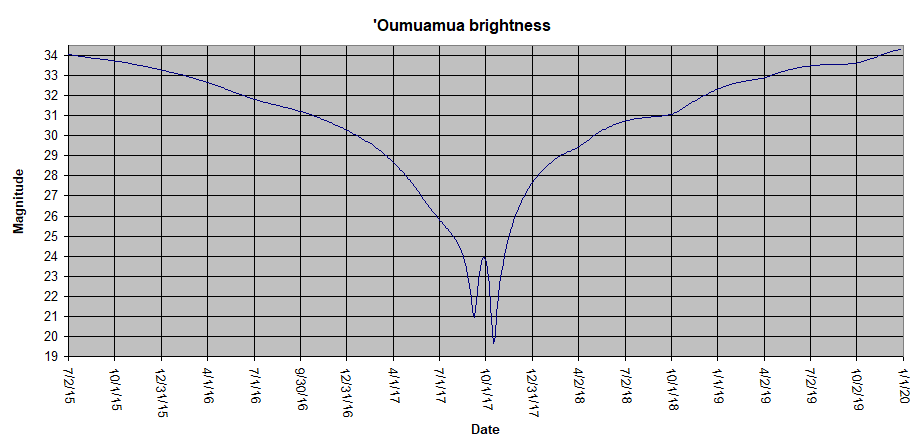
ʻOumuamua had faded to 34th magnitude by 2020.

ʻOumuamua is small and not very luminous. It was not seen in STEREO HI-1A observations near its perihelion on 9 September 2017, limiting its brightness to approximately 13.5 mag. By the end of October, it had already faded to about apparent magnitude 23, and in mid-December 2017, it was too faint and fast-moving to be studied by even the largest ground-based telescopes.

ʻOumuamua was compared to the fictional alien spacecraft Rama due to its interstellar origin. Adding to the coincidence, both the real and the fictional objects are unusually elongated. ʻOumuamua has a reddish hue and unsteady brightness, which are typical of asteroids.

The SETI Institute's radio telescope, the Allen Telescope Array, examined ʻOumuamua, but detected no unusual radio emissions. More detailed observations, using the Breakthrough Listen hardware and the Green Bank Telescope, were performed; the data were searched for narrowband signals and none were found. Given the close proximity to this interstellar object, limits were placed to putative transmitters with the extremely low effective isotropically radiated power of 0.08 watts.

=== Trajectory ===
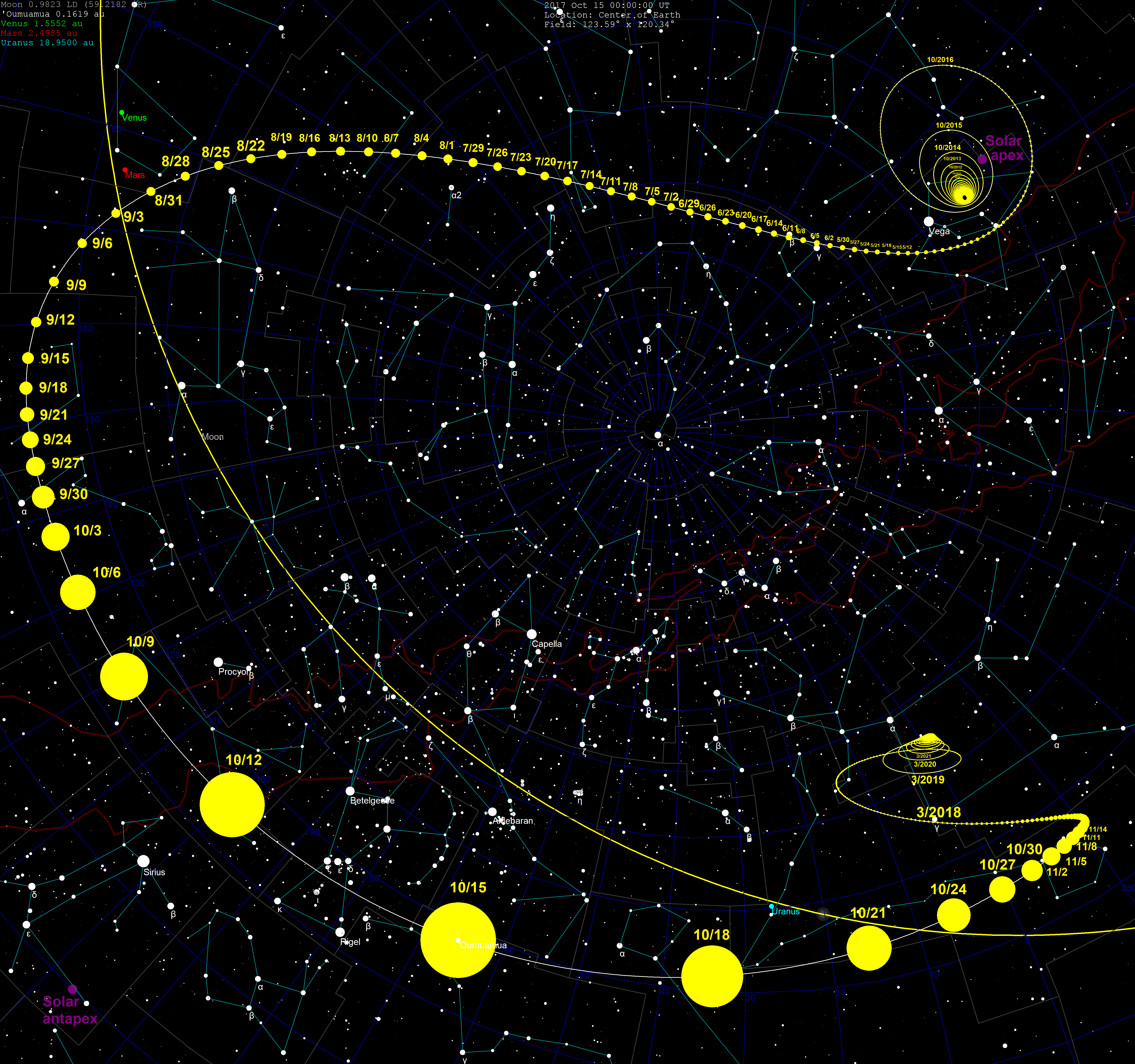
Seen from Earth, the apparent trajectory makes annual retrograde loops in the sky, with its origin in Lyra, temporarily moving south of the ecliptic between 2 September and 22 October 2017, and moving northward again towards its destination in Pegasus.

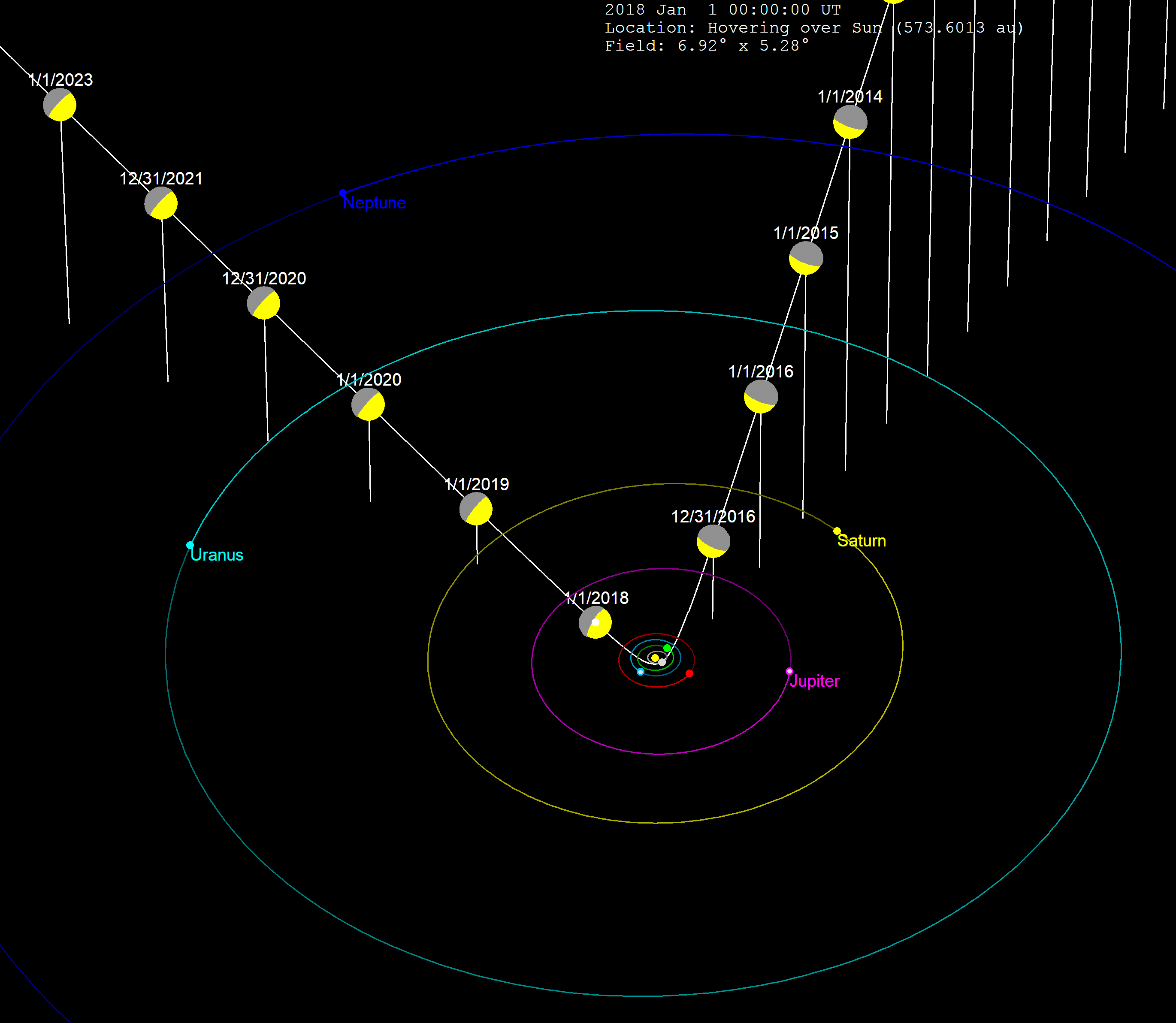
ʻOumuamua's hyperbolic trajectory over the Solar System

ʻOumuamua appears to have come from roughly the direction of Vega in the constellation Lyra. Its inbound direction of motion is 6° from the solar apex (the direction of the Sun's movement relative to local stars), the most likely direction from which objects from outside the Solar System would come. On 26 October, two precovery observations from the Catalina Sky Survey were found dated 14 and 17 October. A two-week observation arc had verified a strongly hyperbolic trajectory. It has a hyperbolic excess velocity (velocity at infinity, $v_{\infty}\!$) of 26.33 km/s (94,800 km/h; 58,900 mph), its speed relative to the Sun when in interstellar space. (Note: For comparison, comet C/1980 E1 will only be moving 4.2 km/s when it is 500 AU from the Sun.)

ʻOumuamua speed relative to the Sun
Distance	Date	Velocity (km/s)
2300 AU	1606	26.41
1000 AU	1839	26.42
100 AU	2000	26.73
10 AU	2016	29.56
1 AU	9 August 2017	49.70
Perihelion	9 September 2017	87.71
1 AU	10 October 2017	49.70 (Note: The solar escape velocity from Earth's orbit (1 AU from the Sun) is 42.1 km/s. For comparison, even 1P/Halley moves at 41.5 km/s when 1 AU from the Sun, according to the formula v = 42.1219 √1/r − 0.5/a, where r is the distance from the Sun, and a is the major semi-axis. Near-Earth asteroid 2062 Aten only moves at 29 km/s when 1 AU from the Sun because of the much smaller semi-major axis.)
10 AU	2019	29.58
100 AU	2034	26.73
1000 AU	2195	26.44
2300 AU	2429	26.40

By mid-November, astronomers were certain that it was an interstellar object. Based on observations spanning 80 days, ʻOumuamua's orbital eccentricity is 1.20, the highest ever observed until 2I/Borisov was discovered in August 2019. An eccentricity exceeding 1.0 means an object exceeds the Sun's escape velocity, is not bound to the Solar System, and may escape to interstellar space. While an eccentricity slightly above 1.0 can be obtained by encounters with planets, as happened with the previous record holder, C/1980 E1, (Note: Unlike ʻOumuamua, C/1980 E1's orbit got its high eccentricity of 1.057 due to a close encounter with Jupiter. Its inbound-orbit eccentricity was less than 1.) ʻOumuamua's eccentricity is so high that it could not have been obtained through an encounter with any of the planets in the Solar System. Even undiscovered planets in the Solar System cannot account for ʻOumuamua's trajectory or boost its speed to the observed value. For these reasons, it can only be of interstellar origin.

Animation of ʻOumuamua passing through the Solar System

Inbound velocity at 200 AU from the Sun compared to Oort cloud objects
Object	Velocity (km/s)	# of observations and obs arc (Note: Orbits computed with only a handful of observations can be unreliable. Short arcs can result in computer generated orbits rejecting some data unnecessarily.)
90377 Sedna	2.66	577 in 12512 days
C/2010 X1 (Elenin)	2.96	2222 in 235 days
C/1980 E1 (Bowell)	2.98	187 in 2514 days
C/1997 P2 (Spacewatch)	2.99	94 in 49 days
C/2012 S1 (ISON)	2.99	6514 in 784 days
1I/2017 U1 (ʻOumuamua)	26.55	207 in 80 days
2I/Borisov	32.43	3249 in 657 days

ʻOumuamua entered the Solar System from north of the plane of the ecliptic. The pull of the Sun's gravity caused it to speed up until it reached its maximum speed of 87.71 km/s (315,800 km/h; 196,200 mph) as it passed south of the ecliptic on 6 September, where the Sun's gravity bent its orbit in a sharp turn northward at its closest approach (perihelion) on 9 September at a distance of 0.255 AU (38,100,000 km; 23,700,000 mi) from the Sun, i.e., about 17% closer than Mercury's closest approach to the Sun. (Note: Comet C/2012 S1 (ISON) peaked at 377 km/s (1,360,000 km/h) at perihelion because it passed 0.0124 AU from the Sun (20 times closer than ʻOumuamua).) It is now heading away from the Sun toward Pegasus, toward a vanishing point 66° from the direction of its approach. (Note: According to the formula: $2\,\theta{_\infty}=2\cos^{-1}(-1/e)$)

On the outward leg of its journey through the Solar System, ʻOumuamua passed beyond the orbit of Earth on 14 October with a closest approach distance of approximately 0.16175 AU (24,197,000 km; 15,036,000 mi) from Earth. On 16 October it moved back north of the ecliptic plane and passed beyond the orbit of Mars on 1 November. It passed beyond Jupiter's orbit in May 2018, beyond Saturn's orbit in January 2019, and beyond Neptune's in 2022. As it leaves the Solar System it will be approximately right ascension 23'51" and declination +24°42', in Pegasus. It will continue to slow down, approaching a speed of 26.33 kilometres per second (94,800 km/h; 58,900 mph) relative to the Sun, the same speed it had before its approach to the Solar System.

==== Non-gravitational acceleration ====
On 27 June 2018, astronomers reported a non-gravitational acceleration to ʻOumuamua's trajectory, potentially consistent with a push from solar radiation pressure. The resulting change in velocity during the period when it was near its closest approach to the Sun summed to about 17 meters per second. Initial speculation as to the cause of this acceleration pointed to the comet-like outgassing, whereby volatile substances inside the object evaporate as the Sun heats its surface. Although no such tail of gasses was observed following the object, researchers estimated that enough outgassing may have increased the object's speed without the gases being detectable. A critical reassessment of the outgassing hypothesis argued that, instead of the observed stability of ʻOumuamua's spin, outgassing would have caused its spin to rapidly change due to its elongated shape, resulting in the object tearing apart.

==== Indications of origin ====
Accounting for Vega's proper motion, it would have taken ʻOumuamua 600,000 years to reach the Solar System from Vega, although it was not in the same part of the sky at that time. Astronomers calculate that 100 years ago the object was 83.9 ± 0.090 billion km; 52.1 ± 0.056 billion mi (561 ± 0.6 AU) from the Sun and traveling at 26.33 km/s with respect to the Sun. This interstellar speed is very close to the mean motion of material in the Milky Way in the neighborhood of the Sun, also known as the local standard of rest (LSR), and especially close to the mean motion of a relatively close group of red dwarf stars. This velocity profile also indicates an extrasolar origin, but appears to rule out the closest dozen stars. In fact, the closeness of ʻOumuamua's velocity to the local standard of rest might mean that it has circulated the Milky Way several times and thus may have originated from an entirely different part of the galaxy.

It is unknown how long the object has been traveling among the stars. The Solar System is likely the first planetary system ʻOumuamua has closely encountered since being ejected from its birth star system, potentially several billion years ago. It has been speculated that the object may have been ejected from a stellar system in one of the local kinematic associations of young stars (specifically, Carina or Columba) within a range of about 100 parsecs, 45 million years ago. The Carina and Columba associations are now very far in the sky from the Lyra constellation, the direction from which ʻOumuamua came when it entered the Solar System. Others have speculated that it was ejected from a white dwarf system and that its volatiles were lost when its parent star became a red giant. About 1.3 million years ago the object may have passed within a distance of 0.16 parsecs (0.52 light-years) to the nearby star TYC 4742-1027-1, but its velocity is too high to have originated from that star system, and it probably just passed through the system's Oort cloud at a relative speed of about 15 km/s (34,000 mph; 54,000 km/h). (Note: This is true for the nominal position of the star. However, its actual distance is not known precisely: According to Gaia Data Release 1, the distance to TYC4742-1027-1 is 137 ± 13 parsecs (447 ± 42 light-years). It is not known if an encounter actually occurred. Update: This star has new measurements in Gaia Data Release 2, and an origins study based on this by Bailer-Jones et al. (2018) shows that TYC4742-1027-1 did not come within 2 pc of ʻOumuamua.) An August 2018 study using Gaia Data Release 2 updated the possible past close encounters and identified four stars—HIP 3757, HD 292249, Gaia DR2 2502921019565490176, and Gaia DR2 3666992950762141312—which ʻOumuamua passed relatively close to at moderately low velocities in the past few million years. This study also identifies future close encounters of ʻOumuamua on its outgoing trajectory from the Sun.

In September 2018, astronomers described several possible home star systems from which ʻOumuamua may have originated. In April 2020, astronomers presented a new possible scenario for the object's origin. According to one hypothesis, ʻOumuamua could be a fragment from a tidally disrupted planet. (Note: See also Ravikov, Roman R. (2018). "1I/2017 ʻOumuamua-like Interstellar Asteroids as Possible Messengers from Dead Stars". The Astrophysical Journal. 861 (1): 35. arXiv:1801.02658. Bibcode:2018ApJ...861...35R. doi:10.3847/1538-4357/aac5ef.. ʻOumuamua is a fragment of a white-dwarf-star tidal-disruption-event. This easily explains its 6:1 or 10:1 elongation and its "refractory" composition; containing probably nickel-iron, possibly other metals, too.) If true, this would make ʻOumuamua a rare object, of a type much less abundant than most extrasolar "dusty-snowball" comets or asteroids. But this scenario leads to cigar-shaped objects, whereas ʻOumuamua's lightcurve favors a disc-like shape. In May 2020, it was proposed that the object was the first observed member of a class of small H_{2}-ice-rich bodies that form at temperatures near 3 K in the cores of giant molecular clouds. The non-gravitational acceleration and high aspect ratio shape of ʻOumuamua might be explainable on this basis. However, it was later calculated that hydrogen icebergs cannot survive their journey through interstellar space.

=== Classification ===
Initially, ʻOumuamua was announced as comet C/2017 U1 (PANSTARRS) based on a strongly hyperbolic trajectory. In an attempt to confirm any cometary activity, very deep stacked images were taken at the Very Large Telescope later the same day, but the object showed no presence of a coma. (Note: According to Central Bureau for Astronomical Telegrams's CBET 4450, none of the observers had detected any sign of cometary activity. The initial classification as a comet was based on the object's orbit.) Accordingly, the object was renamed A/2017 U1, becoming the first comet ever to be re-designated as an asteroid. Once it was identified as an interstellar object, it was designated 1I/2017 U1, the first member of a new class of objects. The lack of a coma limits the amount of surface ice to a few square meters, and any volatiles (if they exist) must lie below a crust at least 0.5 m (1.6 ft) thick. It also indicates that the object must have formed within the frost line of its parent stellar system or have been in the inner region of that stellar system long enough for all near-surface ice to sublimate, as may be the case with damocloids. It is difficult to say which scenario is more likely due to the chaotic nature of small body dynamics, although if it formed in a similar manner to Solar System objects, its spectrum indicates that the latter scenario is true. Any meteoric activity from ʻOumuamua would have been expected to occur on 18 October 2017 coming from the constellation Sextans, but no activity was detected by the Canadian Meteor Orbit Radar.

On 27 June 2018, astronomers reported that ʻOumuamua was thought to be a mildly active comet, and not an asteroid, as previously thought. This was determined by measuring a non-gravitational boost to ʻOumuamua's acceleration, consistent with comet outgassing. However, studies submitted in October 2018 suggest that the object is neither an asteroid nor a comet, although the object could be a remnant of a disintegrated interstellar comet (or exocomet), as suggested by astronomer Zdenek Sekanina. But by 2024, astronomers had identified 14 asteroids with the same unusual behavior. This makes ʻOumuamua the first member of another new class of objects called dark comets.

=== Appearance, shape and composition ===
Spectra from the Hale Telescope on 25 October showed red color resembling comet nuclei or Trojans. Higher signal to noise spectra recorded by the 4.2 m (14 ft) William Herschel Telescope later that day showed that the object was featureless, and colored red like Kuiper belt objects. Spectra obtained with the 8.2 m (27 ft) Very Large Telescope the following night showed that behavior continued into near-infrared wavelengths. Its spectrum is similar to that of D-type asteroids.

Light curve from 25 to 27 October 2017 with dotted line from a model with 10:1 elongation

ʻOumuamua is not rotating around a principal axis, and its motion may be a form of tumbling. This accounts for the various rotation periods reported, such as 8.10 hours (±0.42 hours or ±0.02 hours) by Bannister et al. and Bolin et al. with a lightcurve amplitude of 1.5–2.1 magnitudes, whereas Meech et al. reported a rotation period of 7.3 hours and a lightcurve amplitude of 2.5 magnitudes. (Note: 1865 Cerberus has a lightcurve amplitude of 2.3 magnitudes.) Most likely, ʻOumuamua was set tumbling by a collision in its system of origin, and remains tumbling since the time scale for dissipation of this motion is very long, at least a billion years.

Simulation of ʻOumuamua spinning and tumbling through space, and the resultant light curve. In reality, observations of ʻOumuamua detect the object as a single pixel – its shape here has been inferred from the light curve.

The large variations on the light curves indicate that ʻOumuamua may be anything from a highly elongated cigar-like object, comparable to or greater than the most elongated Solar System objects, to an extremely flat object, a pancake or oblate spheroid. However, the size and shape have not been directly observed as ʻOumuamua appears as nothing more than a point source of light even in the most powerful telescopes. Neither its albedo nor its triaxial ellipsoid shape is known. If cigar-shaped, the longest-to-shortest axis ratio could be 5:1 or greater. Assuming an albedo of 10% (slightly higher than typical for D-type asteroids) and a 6:1 ratio, ʻOumuamua has dimensions of approximately 100 m–1,000 m × 35 m–167 m × 35 m–167 m (328 ft–3,281 ft × 115 ft–548 ft × 115 ft–548 ft) with an average diameter of about 110 m (360 ft). According to astronomer David C. Jewitt, the object is physically unremarkable except for its highly elongated shape. Bannister et al. have suggested that it could also be a contact binary, although this may not be compatible with its rapid rotation. One speculation regarding its shape is that it is a result of a violent event (such as a collision or stellar explosion) that caused its ejection from its system of origin. JPL News reported that ʻOumuamua "is up to one-quarter mile (400 meters) long and highly-elongated — perhaps 10 times as long as it is wide".

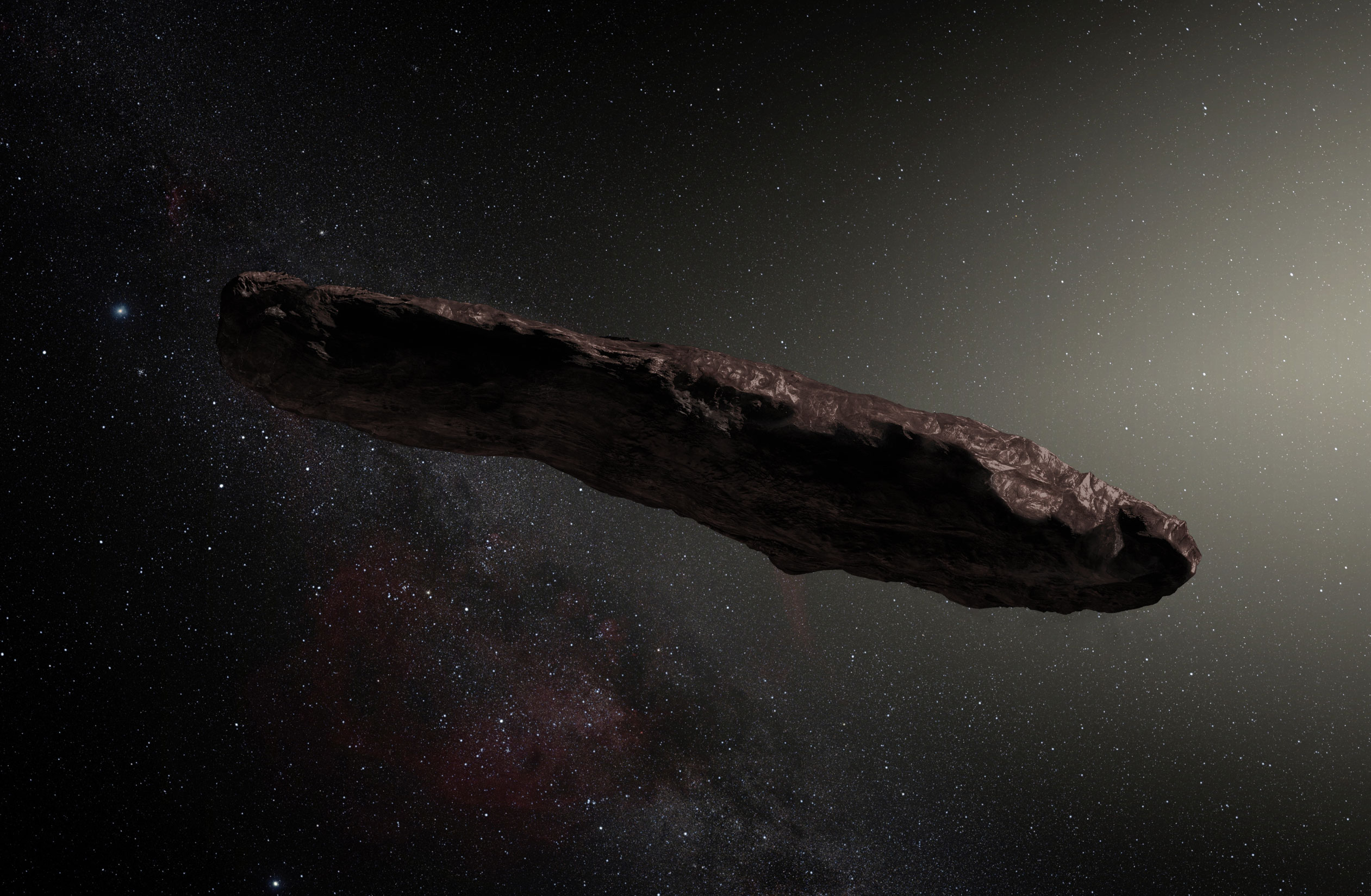
Artist's impression of a cigar-shaped ʻOumuamua

A 2019 paper finds the best models as either a cigar-shape, 1:8 aspect ratio, or disc-shape, 1:6 aspect ratio, with the disc more likely since its rotation does not require a specific orientation to see the range of brightnesses observed. Monte Carlo simulations based on the available orbit determination suggest that the equatorial obliquity of ʻOumuamua could be about 93 degrees, if it has a very prolate or cigar-like shape, or close to 16 degrees, if it is very oblate or disk-like. A 2021 paper proposed that, if ʻOumuamua is made of nitrogen ice, the extreme shape could be a result of recent evaporation, and that when the object entered the Solar System it likely had an unremarkable 2:1 aspect ratio. The authors calculated that in this scenario, a month after perihelion, that ʻOumuamua had lost 92% of the mass it had upon entering the Solar System.

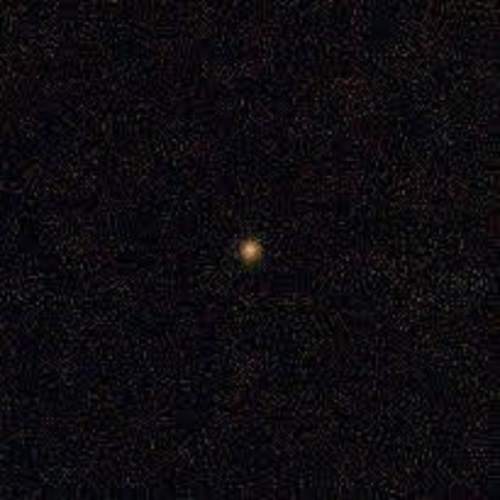
Color composite image taken on 27 October 2017 using the Gemini South telescope

Light curve observations suggest however that the object may be composed of dense metal-rich rock that has been reddened by millions of years of exposure to cosmic rays. It is thought that its surface contains tholins, which are irradiated organic compounds that are more common in objects in the outer Solar System and can help determine the age of the surface. This possibility is inferred from spectroscopic characterization and its reddish color, and from the expected effects of interstellar radiation. Despite the lack of any cometary coma when it approached the Sun, it may still contain internal ice, hidden by "an insulating mantle produced by long-term cosmic ray exposure".

In November 2019, some astronomers noted that ʻOumuamua may be a "cosmic dust bunny", due to its "very lightweight and 'fluffy' conglomerate of dust and ice grains". In August 2020, astronomers reported that ʻOumuamua is not likely to have been composed of frozen hydrogen, which had been proposed earlier; the compositional nature of the object continues to be unknown.

=== Radio measurements ===
In December 2017, astronomer Avi Loeb of Harvard University, an adviser to the Breakthrough Listen Project, cited ʻOumuamua's unusually elongated shape as one reason the Green Bank Telescope in West Virginia would listen for radio emissions from it to see if there were any unexpected signs that it might be of artificial origin, although earlier limited observations by other radio telescopes such as the SETI Institute's Allen Telescope Array had produced no such results. On 13 December 2017, the Green Bank Telescope observed the object for six hours across four bands of radio frequency. No radio signals from ʻOumuamua were detected in this very limited scanning range, but more observations were planned.

== Discussion ==
=== Nitrogen ice theory ===
Outgassing of nitrogen ice (N_{2}) could explain why no outgassing was detected. Nitrogen ice the size of ʻOumuamua could survive for 500 million years in the interstellar medium and would reflect two-thirds of the Sun's light. This explanation has been further supported in March 2021 when scientists presented a theory based on nitrogen ice, and further concluded that ʻOumuamua may be a piece of an exoplanet similar to the dwarf planet Pluto, an exo-Pluto as noted, from beyond the Solar System. This theory has been criticized by Loeb. In November 2021, theoretical studies by Siraj and Loeb hypothesized that ʻOumuamua was not a nitrogen iceberg.

=== Hydrogen ice theory ===
It has been proposed that ʻOumuamua contains a significant amount of hydrogen ice. This would point to it originating from the core of an interstellar molecular cloud, where conditions for the formation of this material might exist. The Sun's heat would cause the hydrogen to sublime, which would in turn propel the body. The hydrogen coma formed by this process would be difficult to detect from Earth-based telescopes, as the atmosphere blocks those wavelengths. Regular water-ice comets undergo this as well, however to a much lesser extent and with a visible coma. This may explain the significant non-gravitational acceleration that ʻOumuamua underwent without showing signs of coma formation. Significant mass loss caused by the sublimation would also explain the unusual cigar-like shape, comparable to how a bar of soap becomes more elongated as it is used up.

However, it was later shown that hydrogen icebergs cannot form out of small grains, and that in order not to evaporate during their journey in interstellar space, they would have had to have been formed about 40 million years ago, in the close neighborhood of the solar system.

=== Hydrogen-laden water ice theory ===
In 2023, it was proposed the observed non-gravitational acceleration and spectrum of ʻOumuamua can be best explained by hydrogen outgassing from the water ice matrix. The buildup of the hydrogen in the water ice is expected to happen in the interstellar comets, due to low-temperature water ice radiolysis by cosmic ray particles while ʻOumuamua or similar cometary body was in interstellar space.

=== Hypothetical space missions ===
The Initiative for Interstellar Studies (i4is) launched Project Lyra to assess the feasibility of a mission to ʻOumuamua. Several options for sending a spacecraft to ʻOumuamua within a time-frame of 5 to 25 years were suggested. Different mission durations and their velocity requirements were explored with respect to the launch date, assuming direct impulsive transfer to the intercept trajectory.

The Space Launch System (also being looked at for "interstellar precursor missions") would be even more capable. Such an interstellar precursor could easily pass by ʻOumuamua on its way out of the Solar System, at speeds of 63 km/s (39 mi/s).

More advanced options of using solar, laser electric, and laser sail propulsion, based on Breakthrough Starshot technology, have also been considered. The challenge is to get to the interstellar object in a reasonable amount of time (and so at a reasonable distance from Earth), and yet be able to gain useful scientific information. To do this, decelerating the spacecraft at ʻOumuamua would be "highly desirable, due to the minimal science return from a hyper-velocity encounter". If the investigative craft goes too fast, it would not be able to get into orbit or land on the object and would fly past it. The authors conclude that, although challenging, an encounter mission would be feasible using near-term technology. Seligman and Laughlin adopt a complementary approach to the Lyra study but also conclude that such missions, though challenging to mount, are both feasible and scientifically attractive.

=== Technosignature hypothesis ===
On 26 October 2018, Loeb and his post-doctoral researcher, Shmuel Bialy, submitted a paper exploring the possibility of ʻOumuamua being an artificial thin solar sail accelerated by solar radiation pressure, in an effort to help explain the object's comet-like non-gravitational acceleration. Other scientists have stated that the available evidence is insufficient to consider such a premise, and that a tumbling solar sail would not be able to accelerate. In response, Loeb wrote an article detailing six anomalous properties of ʻOumuamua that make it unusual, unlike any comets or asteroids seen before 2018, and published a public science book in 2021 about the state of the discussion. The solar sail technosignature hypothesis is considered unlikely by many experts owing to available simpler explanations that align with the expected characteristics of interstellar asteroids and comets.

=== Other interstellar objects ===
2I/Borisov was discovered on 30 August 2019, and was soon confirmed to be an interstellar comet. Arriving from the direction of Cassiopeia, the object arrived at perihelion (closest point to the Sun) on 8 December 2019.

3I/ATLAS was discovered on 1 July 2025. It arrived with a hyperbolic excess velocity of 58 km/s.

Other proposed interstellar objects include the meteors CNEOS 2014-01-08 and CNEOS 2017-03-09 that impacted Earth in 2014 and 2017, respectively, although these claims have been met with skepticism.

== See also ==
- C/1980 E1 (Bowell) – the most eccentric comet known in the Solar System with an eccentricity of 1.057
- 514107 Kaʻepaokaʻāwela, an asteroid of possible interstellar origin
- C/2017 U7, a non-interstellar hyperbolic comet discovered 10 days after ʻOumuamua, announced in March 2018
- C/2018 C2, another non-interstellar hyperbolic comet, announced in March 2018
- Extraterrestrial: The First Sign of Intelligent Life Beyond Earth, a 2021 book by Avi Loeb describing the ʻOumuamua technosignature hypothesis
- Rendezvous with Rama, a 1973 Arthur C. Clarke science-fiction novel about intercepting a large cylindrical spacecraft transiting the Solar System
- 3I/ATLAS, the third interstellar comet discovered in 2025 in the Solar System
