= C/2019 O3 (Palomar) =

Parabolic comet

Discovery
- Discovery site: Palomar Observatory
- Discovery date: 26 July 2019

Orbital characteristics
- Epoch: 22 March 2022 (JD 2459660.5)
- Observation arc: 5.71 years
- Earliest precovery date: 14 May 2019
- Number of observations: 2,138
- Aphelion: ~58,000 AU (inbound); ~14,000 AU (outbound)
- Perihelion: 8.820 AU
- Semi-major axis: ~29,000 AU (inbound); ~7,000 AU (outbound)
- Eccentricity: 0.99969 (inbound); 0.99874 (outbound)
- Orbital period: ~4.9 million years (inbound); ~590,000 years (outbound)
- Inclination: 89.819°
- Longitude of ascending node: 300.39°
- Argument of periapsis: 60.096°
- Mean anomaly: 0.0031°
- Last perihelion: 8 March 2021
- Earth MOID: 8.273 AU
- Jupiter MOID: 5.492 AU

Physical characteristics
- Mean radius: >7.9 km (4.9 mi)
- Spectral type: (B−V) = 0.75±0.03; (V−R) = 0.47±0.03; (V−I) = 0.94±0.09
- Comet total magnitude (M1): 6.1
- Comet nuclear magnitude (M2): 8.0
- Apparent magnitude: 13.6 (2021 apparition)

C/2019 O3 (Palomar) is a distant Oort cloud comet that came to perihelion on 8 March 2021 at a distance of 8.82 AU (1.319 billion km) from the Sun. It is discovered from the Palomar Observatory in July 2019, and is one of eight comets named after it.
