= C/1980 E1 (Bowell) =

Hyperbolic comet

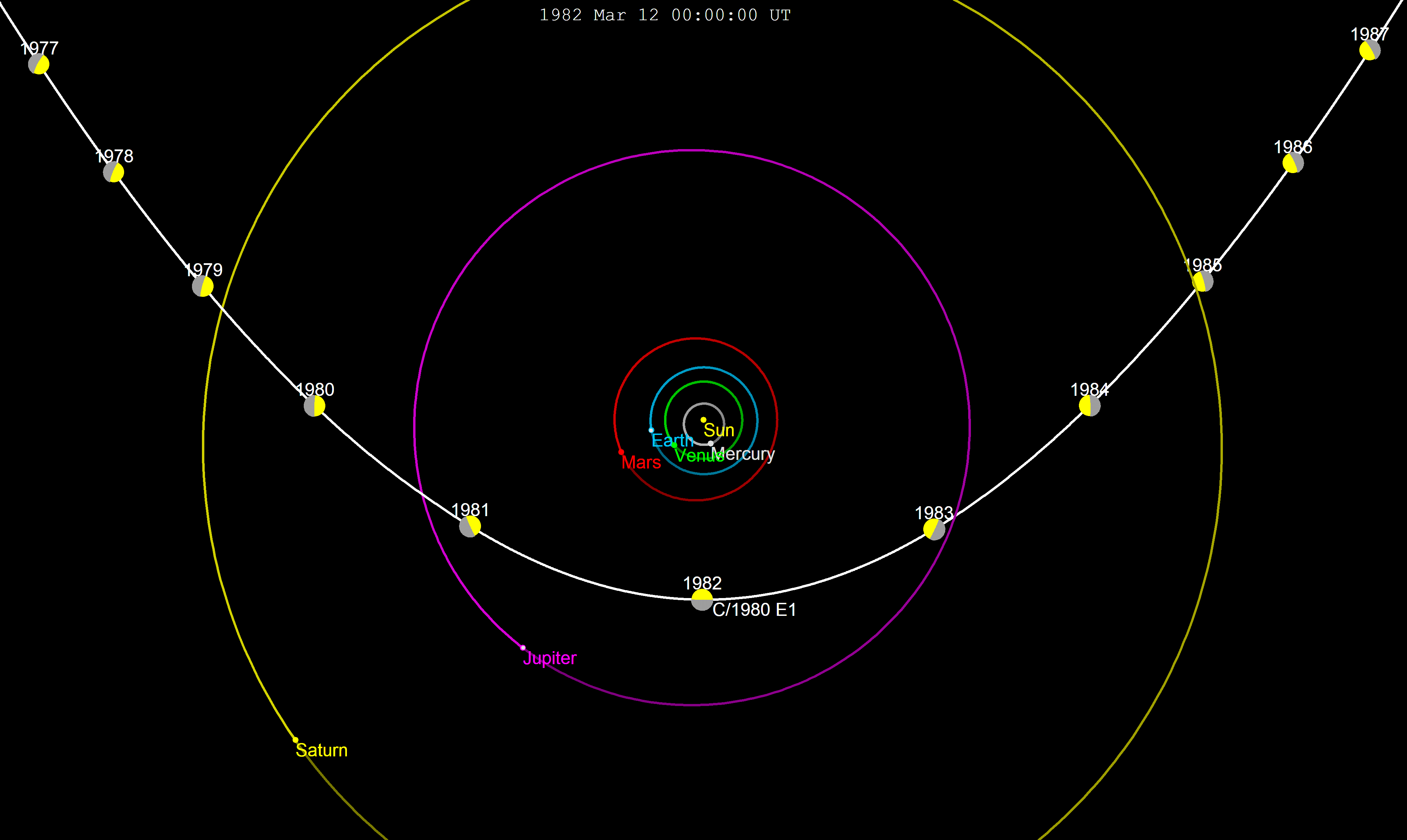
- Hyperbolic path with annual motion

Discovery
- Discovered by: Edward L. G. Bowell
- Discovery date: 11 February 1980

Orbital characteristics
- Epoch: 3 January 1982 (JD 2444972.5)
- Observation arc: 6.88 years
- Number of observations: 187
- Aphelion: ~75,000 AU (inbound)
- Perihelion: 3.3639 AU
- Eccentricity: 1.057(hyperbolic trajectory); 1.053 (epoch 1984+)
- Orbital period: ~7.1 million years (epoch 1950); Ejection (epoch 1977+)
- Inclination: 1.6617°
- Longitude of ascending node: 114.558°
- Argument of periapsis: 135.083°
- Last perihelion: 12 March 1982

Physical characteristics
- Dimensions: > 1 km
- Comet total magnitude (M1): 5.8

C/1980 E1 is a non-periodic comet discovered by Edward L. G. Bowell on 11 February 1980 and which came closest to the Sun (perihelion) in March 1982. It is leaving the Solar System on a hyperbolic trajectory due to a close approach to Jupiter. In the 43 years since its discovery only 3 objects with higher eccentricities have been identified, 1I/ʻOumuamua (1.2), 2I/Borisov (3.35), and 3I/ATLAS (6.15).

== Overview ==
Before entering the inner Solar System for a 1982 perihelion passage, C/1980 E1 had a barycentric (epoch 1950-Jan-01) orbit with an aphelion of 75,000 AU (1.2 ly), and a period of approximately 7.1 million years.

As the comet was approaching on 9 December 1980, it passed within 0.228 AU of Jupiter, which accelerated the comet briefly giving an (epoch 1981-Jan-09) eccentricity of 1.066. The comet came to perihelion on 12 March 1982, when it had a velocity of 23.3 km/s (52,000 mph) with respect to the Sun. Since the epoch of 1977-Mar-04, C/1980 E1 has had a barycentric eccentricity greater than 1, keeping it on a hyperbolic trajectory that will eject it from the Solar System. Objects in hyperbolic orbits have a negative semimajor axis, giving them a positive orbital energy. After leaving the Solar System, C/1980 E1 will have an interstellar velocity ($v_\infty$) of 3.77 km/s. (Note: v = 42.1219 √1/r − 0.5/a, where r is the distance from the Sun, and a is the major semi-axis. At epoch 2500, C/1980 E1 will have a barycentric semi-major axis of −62.44.) The Minor Planet Center does not directly list a semimajor axis for this comet. On 24 January 2022, C/2024 L5 (ATLAS) had a similar episode with Saturn, resulting in its ejection from the Solar System.

The escape velocity from the Sun at Neptune's orbit is 7.7 km/s. By June 1995, the comet was passing Neptune's orbit at 30.1 AU from the Sun continuing its ejection trajectory at 8.6 km/s. Since February 2008, the comet has been more than 50 AU from the Sun.

C/1980 E1 distance and velocity compared to the Sun with a 300-year stepsize
Date	Sun distance (AU)	Velocity wrt Sun (km/s)	Uncertainty region (3-sigma)
1682-03-12	248.8 AU (37.22 billion km; 23.13 billion mi)	2.68	± 7 million km
Perihelion	3.364 AU (503.2 million km; 312.7 million mi)	23.3	± 1589 km
2282-03-12	337.2 AU (50.44 billion km; 31.34 billion mi)	4.43	± 5 million km

Emission of OH (hydroxide) was observed pre-perihelion while the comet was nearly 5 AU from the Sun. CN (cyanide) was not detected until the comet was near perihelion. The comet nucleus was estimated to have a radius of several kilometers. The surface crust was probably a few meters thick.

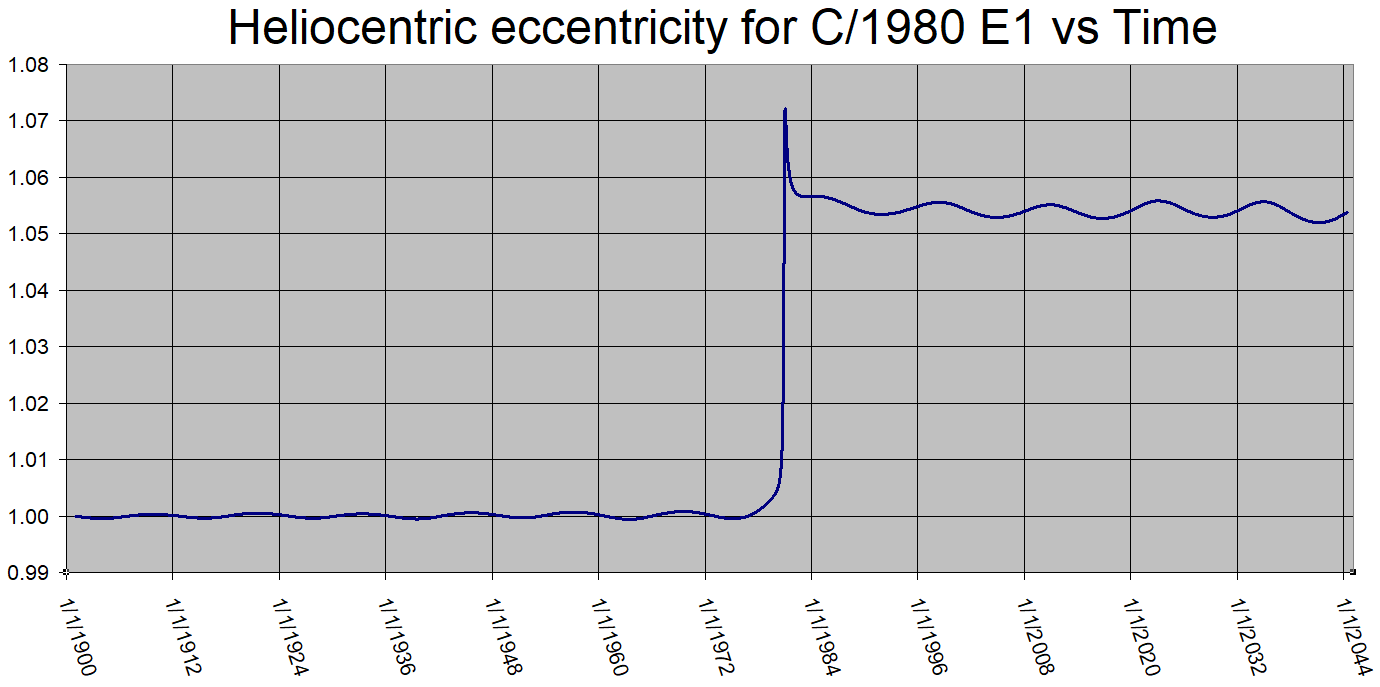
Eccentricity vs time

Animation of C/1980 E1's orbit C/1980 E1 (Bowell) · Sun · · Earth · Mars · Jupiter · Saturn

== See also ==
- List of Solar System objects by greatest aphelion
- List of hyperbolic comets
- List of non-periodic comets
- List of periodic comets
- 1I/ʻOumuamua
- 2I/Borisov
- 3I/ATLAS
- C/2024 L5 (ATLAS)
