= C/2018 C2 (Lemmon) =

Non-periodic comet

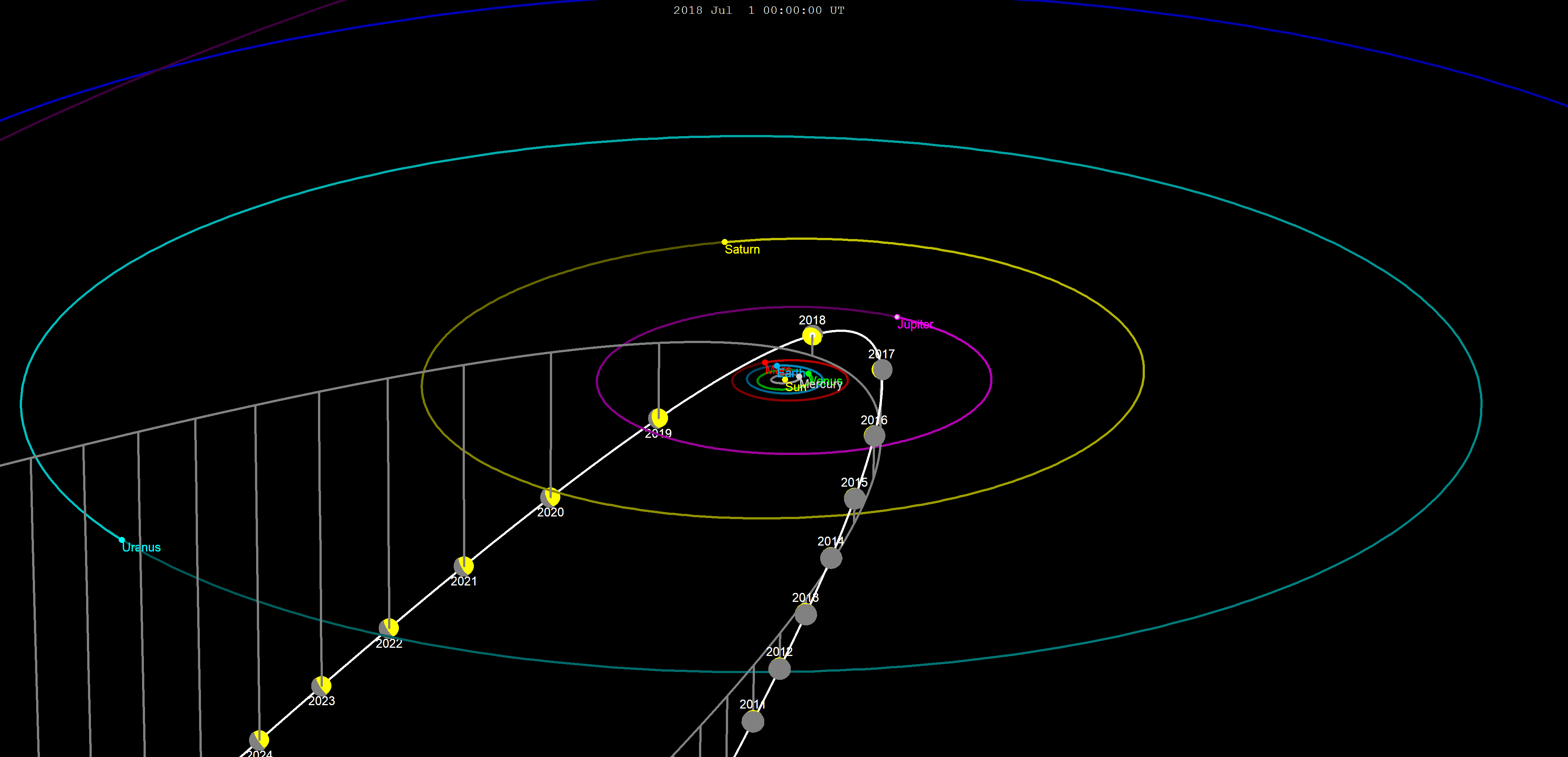
- The orbit of C/2018 C2 (Lemmon)

Discovery
- Discovery site: Mount Lemmon Observatory
- Discovery date: 5 February 2018

Designations
- MPC designation: C/2018 C2, A/2018 C2
- Alternative designations: ZC82561

Orbital characteristics
- Epoch: 20 May 2018 (JD 2458258.5)
- Observation arc: 272 days
- Earliest precovery date: 28 January 2018
- Number of observations: 1,672
- Aphelion: ~50,000 AU (inbound); ~5,170 AU (outbound)
- Perihelion: 1.956 AU
- Semi-major axis: ~25,700 AU (inbound); ~2,590 AU (outbound)
- Eccentricity: 0.99992 (inbound); 0.99925 (outbound)
- Orbital period: ~4.1 million years (inbound); ~130,000 years (outbound)
- Inclination: 34.453°
- Longitude of ascending node: 91.139°
- Argument of periapsis: 134.14°
- Last perihelion: 2 June 2018
- Earth MOID: 1.062 AU
- Jupiter MOID: 1.405 AU

Physical characteristics
- Mean radius: 4.4±0.5 km
- Geometric albedo: 0.04 (assumed)
- Spectral type: (B–V) = 0.75±0.03; (V–R) = 0.41±0.02; (R–I) = 0.37±0.03
- Comet total magnitude (M1): 7.6
- Comet nuclear magnitude (M2): 14.8
- Apparent magnitude: 15.2 (2018 apparition)

C/2018 C2 (Lemmon) is a hyperbolic comet (previously classified as A/2018 C2, a hyperbolic asteroid). It was first observed on 5 February 2018 by the Mount Lemmon Survey conducted at the Mount Lemmon Observatory near Tucson, Arizona. The discovery was announced on 4 March 2018 along with another hyperbolic object, A/2017 U7. On 22 March 2018 it was determined to be a hyperbolic comet.

== Orbit ==
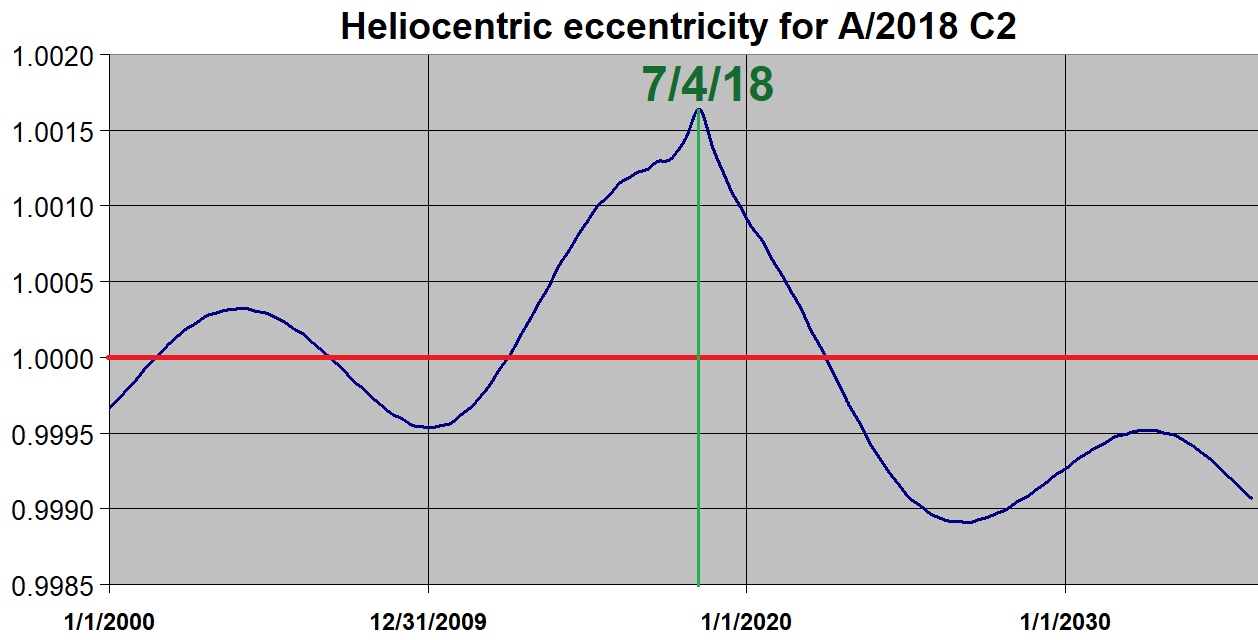
Heliocentric eccentricity from 2000–2035 which is strongly influenced by Jupiter's 12 year orbital period.

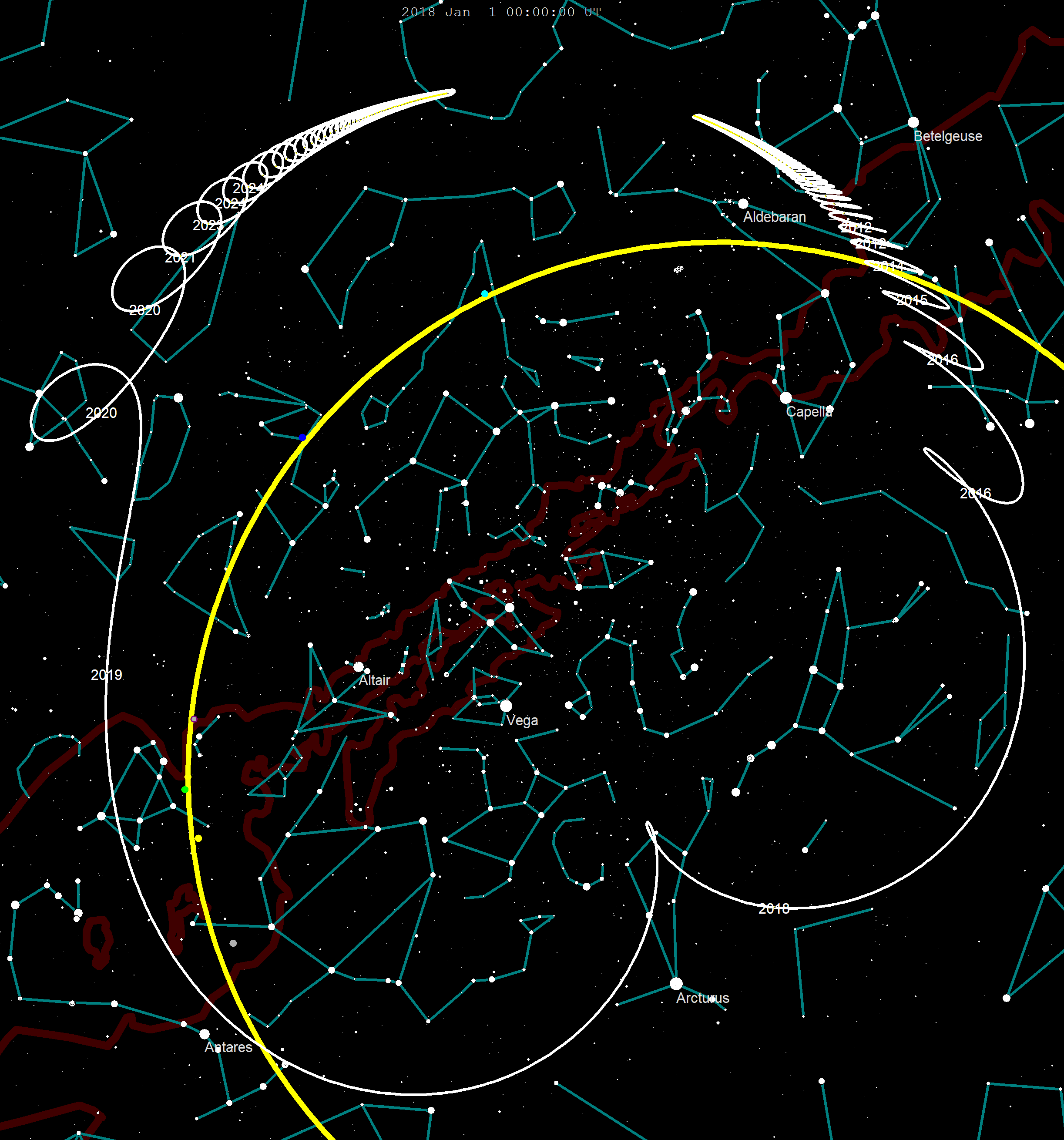
The path of C/2018 C2 across the sky with annual retrograde loops

While near perihelion, A/2018 C2's heliocentric orbit is not bound to the Solar System, unlike ʻOumuamua, it is not an interstellar object. The heliocentric eccentricity drops below 1 starting with an epoch of January 2023, when it is 13.8 AU from the Sun, making the orbit bound to the Sun before it leaves the planetary region of the Solar System. The more stable barycentric orbit of A/2018 C2, shows that it is only a very distant small Solar System body, approaching as far as 50,000 AU from the Sun, around the distance of the Oort Cloud. It had an orbital period of millions of years until the current approach to the Solar System, where perturbations will shorten the orbit drastically to about 5,200 AU, with an orbital period of 130,000 years. Hui Man-To calculated that the comet would have its next perihelion after 130 to 140 thousands years, at a distance of about 2 AU.

As of March 2018, A/2018 C2 was inbound 2.2 AU (330,000,000 km; 200,000,000 mi) from the Sun. A/2018 C2 made its closest approach to the Sun on 2 June 2018 at a distance of 1.9 AU (280 million km) (outside the orbit of Mars). Since this object out gassed generating a cometary coma while near the inner Solar System, it was reclassified as a hyperbolic comet.
