= July–September 2022 in science =

This article lists a number of significant events in science that have occurred in the second quarter of 2022.

== Events ==
=== July ===
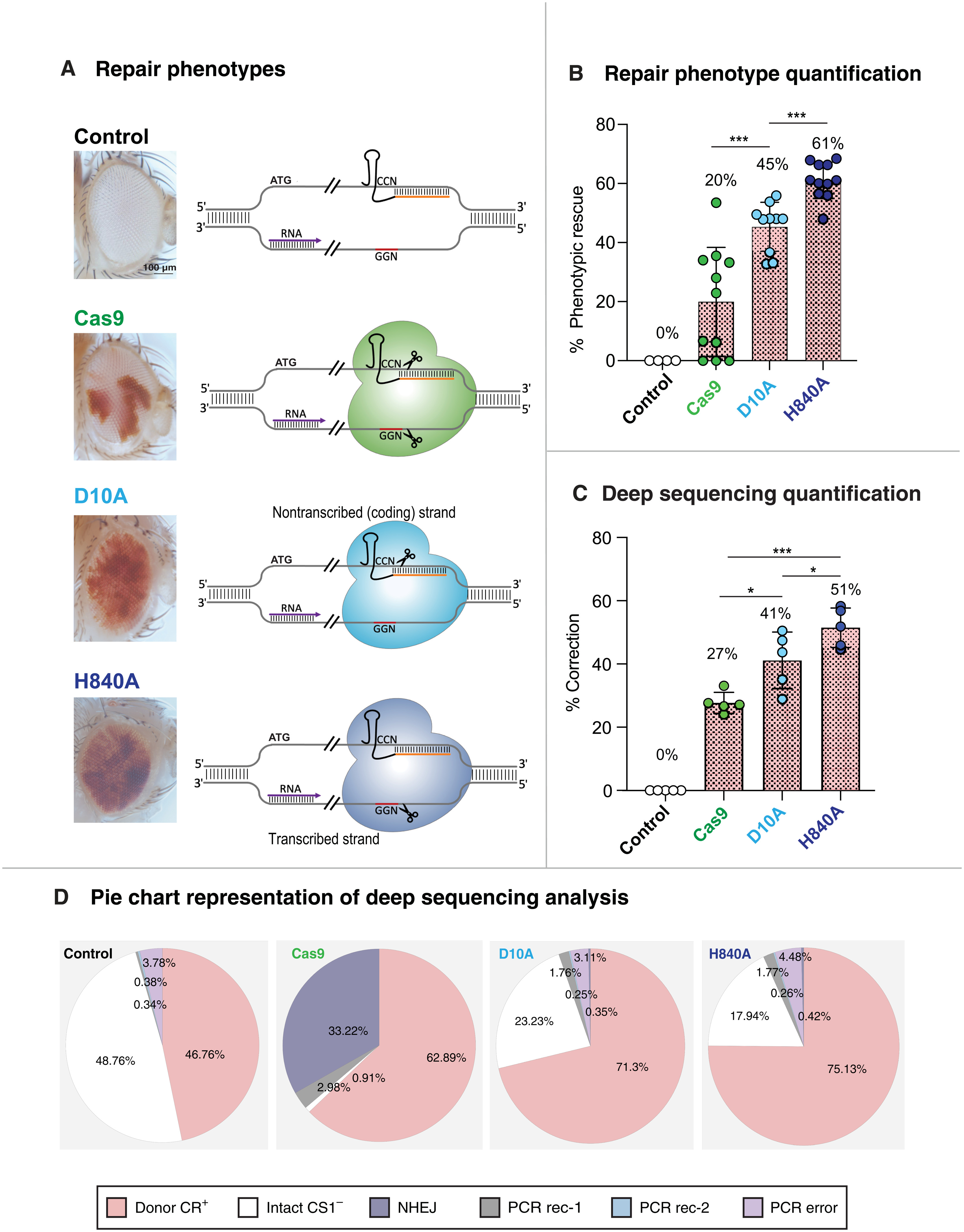
1 July: A new CRISPR gene editing/repair tool alternative to fully active Cas9 is reported.

12 July: The 'cosmic cliffs' of the Carina Nebula: One of the first images to be released from the now fully operational James Webb Space Telescope.

- 1 July
  - Scientists show why climate benefits from nature restoration are "dwarfed by the scale of ongoing fossil fuel emissions".
  - A new CRISPR gene editing/repair tool alternative to fully active Cas9 is reported – Cas9-derived nickases mediated homologous chromosome-templated repair, applicable to organisms whose matching chromosome has the desired gene/s, which is demonstrated to be more effective than Cas9 and cause fewer off-target edits.
- 4 July – Scientists report that heatwaves in western Europe are increasing "three-to-four times faster compared to the rest of the northern midlatitudes over the past 42 years" and that certain atmospheric dynamical changes can explain their increase.
- 5 July
  - – The Large Hadron Collider commences its Run 3 physics season. The LHCb collaboration observes three never-before-seen particles: a new kind of "pentaquark" and the first-ever pair of "tetraquarks", which includes a new type of tetraquark.
  - Scientists based in Bengaluru's Jawaharlal Nehru Centre for Advanced Scientific Research (JNCASR) have found a novel substance termed “single-crystalline scandium nitride” that can transform infrared light into renewable energy.
- 6 July – A study suggests that the marginal effectiveness of a fourth COVID-19 vaccine dose (a second "booster") versus three doses can be 40% (24% to 52%) against severe disease outcomes. There is no scientific consensus about the efficacy and overall recommendabilities of a fourth dose. The CDC recommended such in March only for "certain immunocompromised individuals and people over the age of 50".

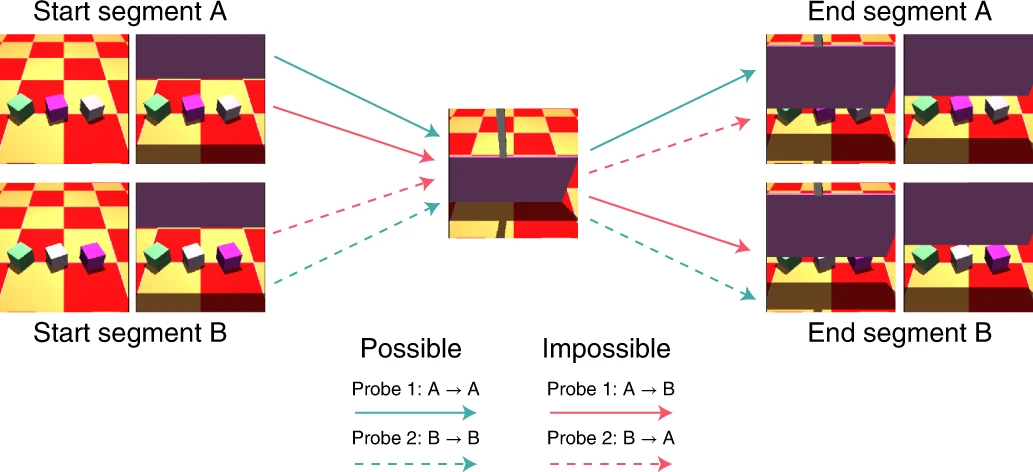
11 & 25 July: Deep learning systems learn intuitive basic physics similar to infants and any physics via potential variables-identification from only visual data (of virtual 3D environments).

- 7 July
  - The first tandem perovskite-silicon solar cell to exceed 30% efficiency (31.25%) is independently certified by the National Renewable Energy Laboratory.
  - A study into the effects of a global nuclear war on the world's oceans is published, revealing a rapid 10.5 °C (18.9 °F) drop in temperature, along with many longer-lasting impacts.
- 8 July – Astronomers report the discovery of massive amounts of prebiotic molecules, including precursors for RNA, in the Galactic Center of the Milky Way Galaxy.
- 9 July – Researchers report the development of an efficient, secure and convenient method to separate, purify, store and transport large amounts of hydrogen for energy storage in renewables-based energy systems as powder using ball milling.
- 11 July
  - Researchers report the development of a deep learning system that learns intuitive physics from visual data (of virtual 3D environments) to some degree "from scratch" based on an unpublished approach inspired by studies of visual cognition in infants. On 25 July, other researchers report the development of a machine learning algorithm that could discover sets of basic variables of various physical systems and predict the systems' future dynamics from video recordings of their behavior.
  - News outlets report about the development of algae biopanels by a company for sustainable energy generation with unclear viability after other researchers built the self-powered BIQ house prototype in 2013.
- 12 July – NASA releases the first suite of images from the now fully operational James Webb Space Telescope, a day after releasing the Webb's First Deep Field, the image of early universe with the highest resolution. On 14 July, NASA presents images of Jupiter and related areas captured, for the first time, and including infrared views, by the telescope. On 19 July, scientists report what could be the earliest and most distant galaxy ever discovered, GLASS-z12.
- 13 July
  - The discovery of fast radio burst FRB 20191221A with an unusually long duration of three seconds is reported.
  - A study affirms (see 7 March) that critical slowing down indicators suggest that tropical, arid and temperate forests are substantially losing resilience. On 4 July, Brazil's INPE reports that the country's regions of the Amazon rainforest have been deforested by a record amount in the first half of 2022.
  - A study shows that blood cells' loss of the Y chromosome in a subset of cells, reportedly affecting at least 40% of 70 years-old men to some degree, contributes to fibrosis, heart risks, and mortality in a causal way.
  - Researchers report the development of semitransparent solar cells that are as large as windows, after team members achieved record efficiency with high transparency in 2020. On 4 July, researchers report the fabrication of solar cells with a record average visible transparency of 79%, being nearly invisible.

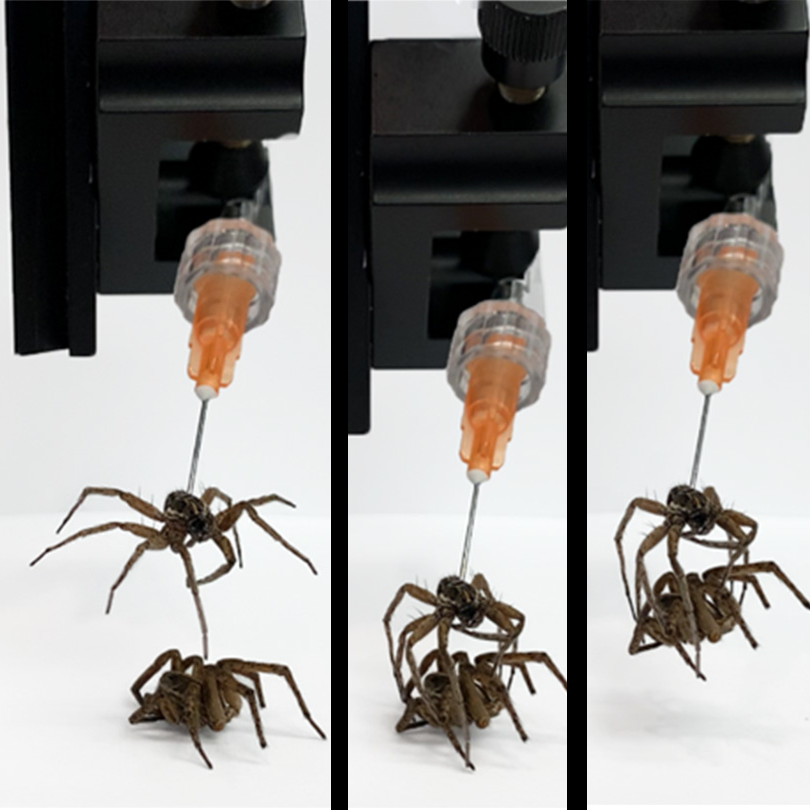
25 July: Researchers introduce and demonstrate the concept of necrobotics.

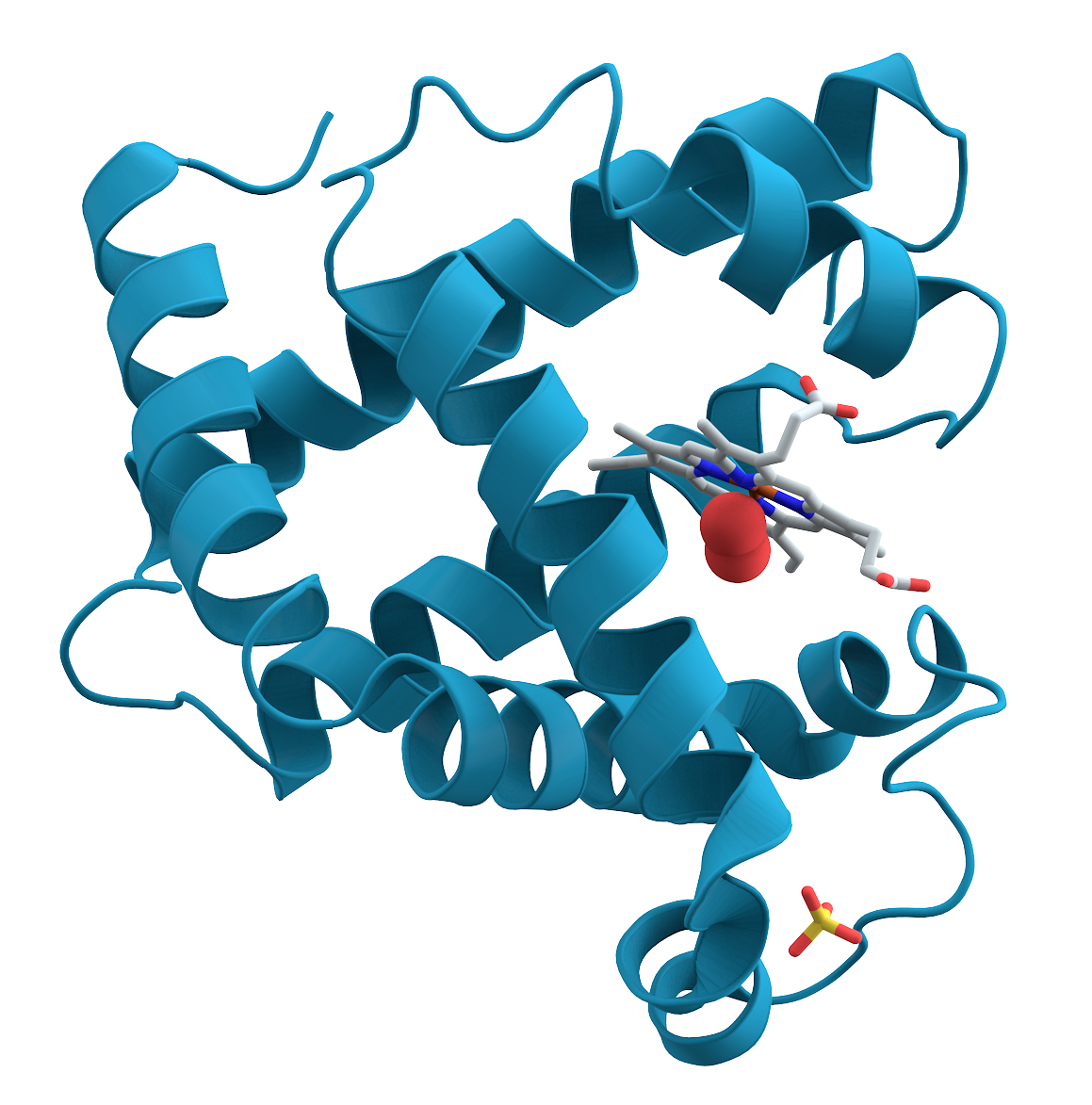
28 July: AI company DeepMind reports that its AlphaFold program has determined the likely structure of nearly every protein known to science.

- 18 July
  - A survey of more than 3,000 experts finds that the extinction crisis could be worse than previously thought, and estimates that roughly 30% of species "have been globally threatened or driven extinct since the year 1500."
  - The first "dormant" black hole (meaning it does not emit high levels of X-ray radiation) is identified outside the Milky Way. The object, with nine solar masses, orbits a rare O-type star in a system called VFTS 243 within the Large Magellanic Cloud.
  - A study shows that climate change-related exceptional marine heatwaves in the Mediterranean Sea during 2015–2019 resulted in widespread mass sealife die-offs in five consecutive years.
- 20 July – Scientists report that SARS-CoV-2 builds tunneling nanotubes from nose cells to gain access to the brain.
- 21 July
  - A potential gene therapy cure for haemophilia B, which corrects the genetic defect associated with the condition is announced with trial results by doctors. It caused a sustained increase in factor IX activity in 9 of 10 patients in the small trial.
  - Sunspot AR3060 explodes early in the morning. It releases a C-5 class solar flare, and a "solar tsunami". The NOAA predicts that a geomagnetic storm from this event will strike the Earth on 23 July, between 0000 UTC and 0400 UTC, as a G2 class storm, with a slight chance of a G3 storm. Aurorae could be visible as far south as 50° N latitude.
  - Researchers report the development of deep learning software that can design proteins that contain prespecified functional sites.
- 23 July – The World Health Organization (WHO) declares the recent monkeypox outbreak a Public Health Emergency of International Concern, as the number of reported cases worldwide exceeds 17,000. In July, scientists reported that the window to be able to contain the outbreak is closing or has closed. On 5 July, a preprint indicates there can be asymptomatic infections. On 27 July, an analysis of studies by a journalist indicates that "about 10-to-15% of cases have been hospitalized, mostly for pain and bacterial infections that can occur as a result of monkeypox lesions". Studies published in August indicated hospitalizations of small cohorts of early patients were 8% and 13%.
- 25 July
  - Researchers introduce the concept of necrobotics and demonstrate it by repurposing dead spiders as robotic grippers by activating their gripping arms via applying pressurized air.
  - Researchers review the scientific literature on 100% renewable energy, addressing various issues, outlining open research questions, and concluding there to be growing consensus, research and empirical evidence concerning its feasibility worldwide.
- 26 July – Scientists analyse 2.8 million of the sequenced SARS-CoV-2 genomes and use the results to compile a 'mutations blacklist' of virus weak spots, and a 'whitelist' of mutations that would make it more transmissible.
- 27 July – Progress towards a pan coronavirus vaccine is announced, following tests on mice. Antibodies targeting the S2 subunit of SARS-CoV-2's spike protein are found to neutralise multiple coronavirus variants.
- 28 July
  - DeepMind announces that its AlphaFold program has uncovered the structures of more than 200 million folded proteins, essentially all of those known to science.
  - Researchers report the development of a wearable bioadhesive stretchable high-resolution ultrasound imaging patch for days-long continuous imaging of diverse organs which may enable novel diagnostic and monitoring tools.
  - First reported discovery of an animal helping algae reproduce after pollination in the sea was first reported in 2016.
  - Researchers report the development of nanoscale brain-inspired artificial synapses, using the ion proton (H^{+}), for 'analog deep learning'.
  - Scientists report the discovery of chemical reactions by potential primordial soup components that produced amino acids and may be part of the origin of life on Earth.
- 29 July
  - In a preprint, scientists from the Galileo Project describe a planned expedition to retrieve small fragments of interstellar meteor CNEOS 2014-01-08, which "appears to be rare both in composition and in speed" and is not ruled out to be "extraterrestrial equipment", using a magnetic sled on the seafloor of the impact region.
  - A study, that reanalyzes data used in a study by DeSilva et al. (2021), indicates that human brain size did not decrease over the last three thousand years as suggested by this study nor within 300 ka as suggested by other studies. It concludes that "the samples need to be specific enough to test the hypothesis across different times and populations".

=== August ===
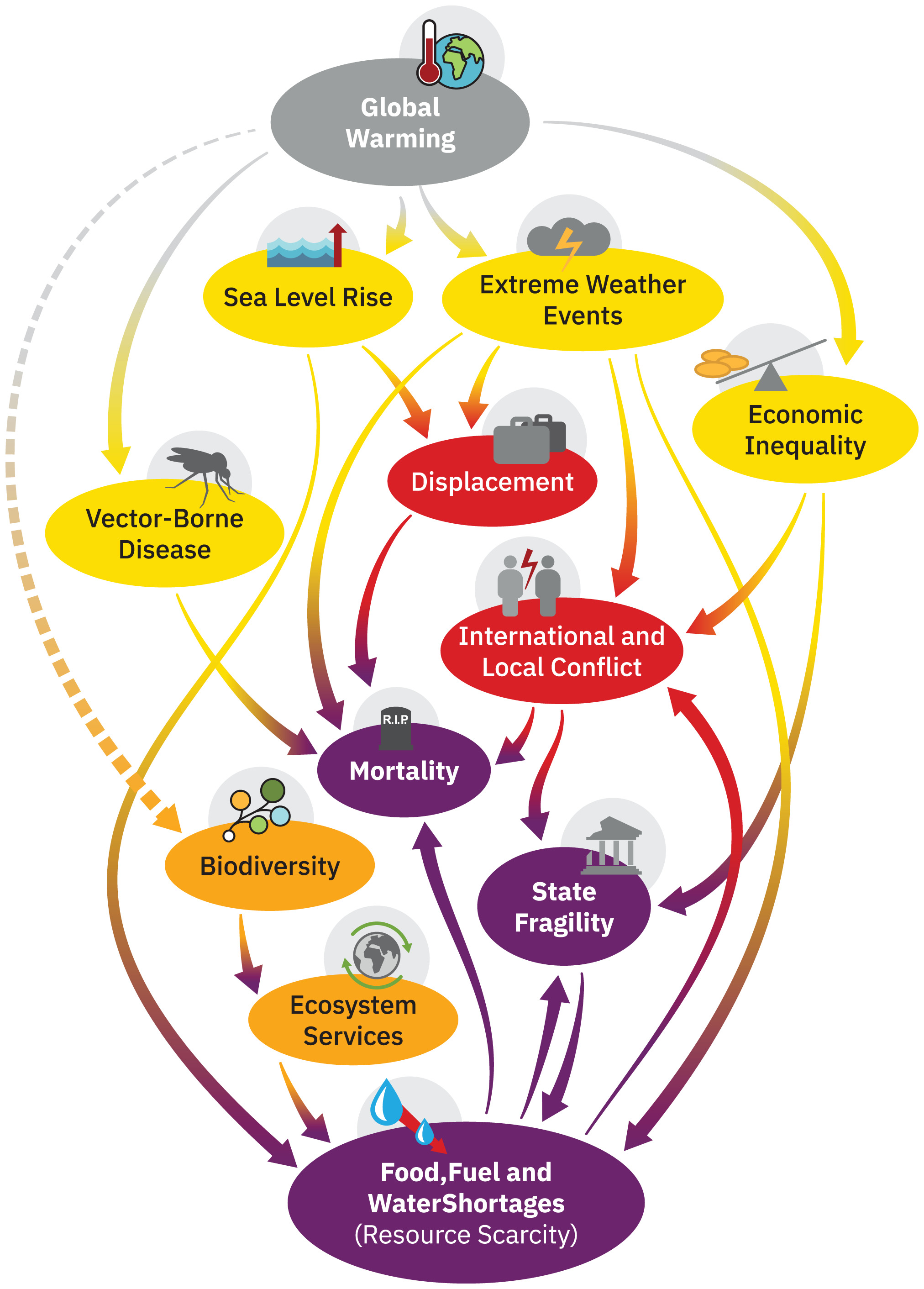
1 August: Researchers report that the risk of climate change (indirectly) resulting in worldwide societal collapse, or possibly eventual human extinction, is a "dangerously underexplored" global topic.

- 1 August
  - A meta-analysis of policy studies concludes that international treaties that aim to foster global cooperation have mostly failed to produce their intended effects in addressing global challenges, with the exception of international trade and finance regulations. The study suggests enforcement mechanisms are the "only modifiable treaty design choice" with the potential to improve the effectiveness.
  - The discovery of a super-Earth around the red dwarf star Ross 508 is reported. Part of the planet's elliptical orbit takes it within the habitable zone.
  - Researchers report that the risk of climate change (indirectly) resulting in worldwide societal collapse, or possibly eventual human extinction, is a "dangerously underexplored" global topic, despite there being indications of such being possible as worst-case scenarios and "integrated catastrophe assessment" missing.
  - Israeli researchers report the achievement of first stem-cell derived synthetic embryos, which are "organ-filled" and were grown solely from mouse embryonic stem cells, without sperm or eggs or a uterus, with natural-like development and some surviving until day 8.5 where early organogenesis, including formation of foundations of a brain, occurs. They grew in vitro and subsequently ex utero in an artificial womb devised in the year before by the same team.
- 2 August
  - Scientists conclude that the overall transgressed (see 18 January) planetary boundary for "novel entities" (NEs) is a placeholder for multiple different boundaries for NEs that may emerge, reporting that PFAS pollution is one such new boundary. They show that levels of these so-called "forever chemicals" in rainwater are ubiquitously, and often greatly, above guideline safe levels worldwide. There are moves to restrict and replace their use.
    On 18 August, a simple method of breaking down these chemicals once they have been pulled out of contaminated water or soil is described.
  - A preprint describes the donations-funded plans of The Galileo Project in detail: a systematic scientific research program searching for (signs of) extraterrestrial technological civilizations (ETCs) on and near Earth.
- 3 August – Scientists report an organ perfusion system that can restore, i.e. on the cellular level, multiple vital (pig) organs one hour after death (during which the body had warm ischaemia), after reporting a similar method/system for reviving (pig) brains hours after death in 2019. This could be used to preserve donor organs or for revival in medical emergencies.
- 4 August – Lab-made cartilage gel based on a synthetic hydrogel composite is found to have greater strength and wear resistance than natural cartilage, which could enable the durable resurfacing of damaged articulating joints.
- 8 August
  - Researchers provide a dataset of standardized calculated detailed environmental impacts of >57,000 circulating food products, potentially e.g. informing consumers or policy.
  - A study quantifies the large extent of climate change impacts on infectious diseases.
  - The creation of artificial neurons that can receive and release dopamine (chemical signals rather than electrical signals) and communicate with natural rat muscle and brain cells is reported, with potential for use in BCIs/prosthetics.
  - A screening AI system for many cancer types that integrates different types of data via multimodal learning is reported.

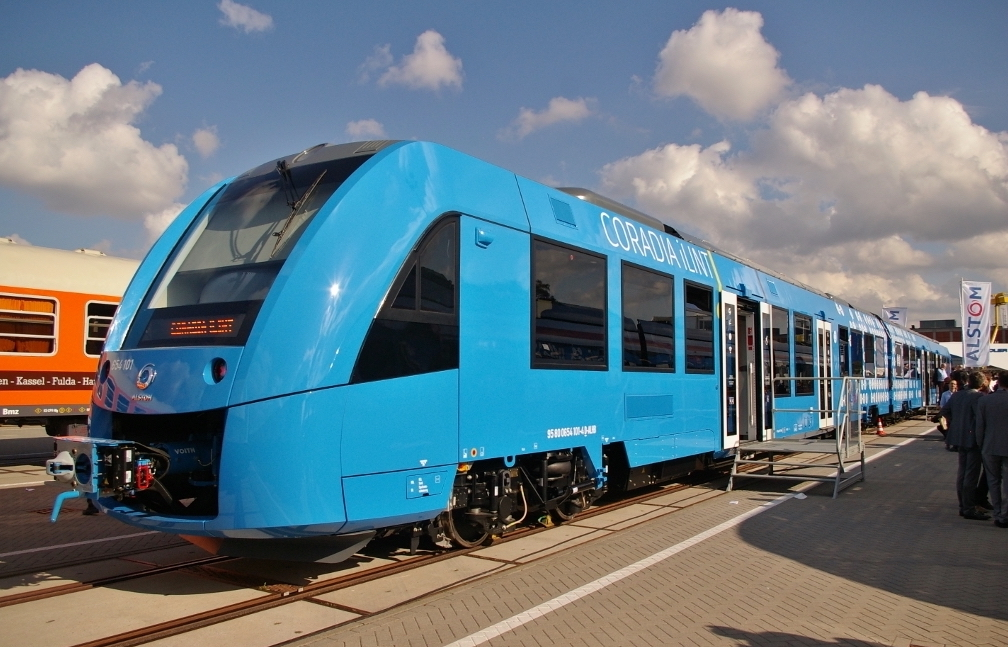
24 August: The first rail line entirely run by hydrogen-powered trains debuts in Germany.

- 10 August – 2022 monkeypox outbreak: Evidence of human-to-dog transmission is reported.
  On 4 August, a preprint reports that early post-exposure ring vaccination despite high efficacy "did not completely prevent breakthrough infections".
  On 15 August, a preprint suggests the virus has potential to infect a diverse range of native animals across Europe.
  On 16 August, a review recommends a 'living guideline' framework for needed clinical management research.
  On 19 August, a CDC study summarizes current knowledge about the transmission of monkeypox.
  Wastewater surveillance, which substantially expanded during the COVID-19 pandemic is used to detect monkeypox, with one team of researchers describing their qualitative detection method on 31 August.

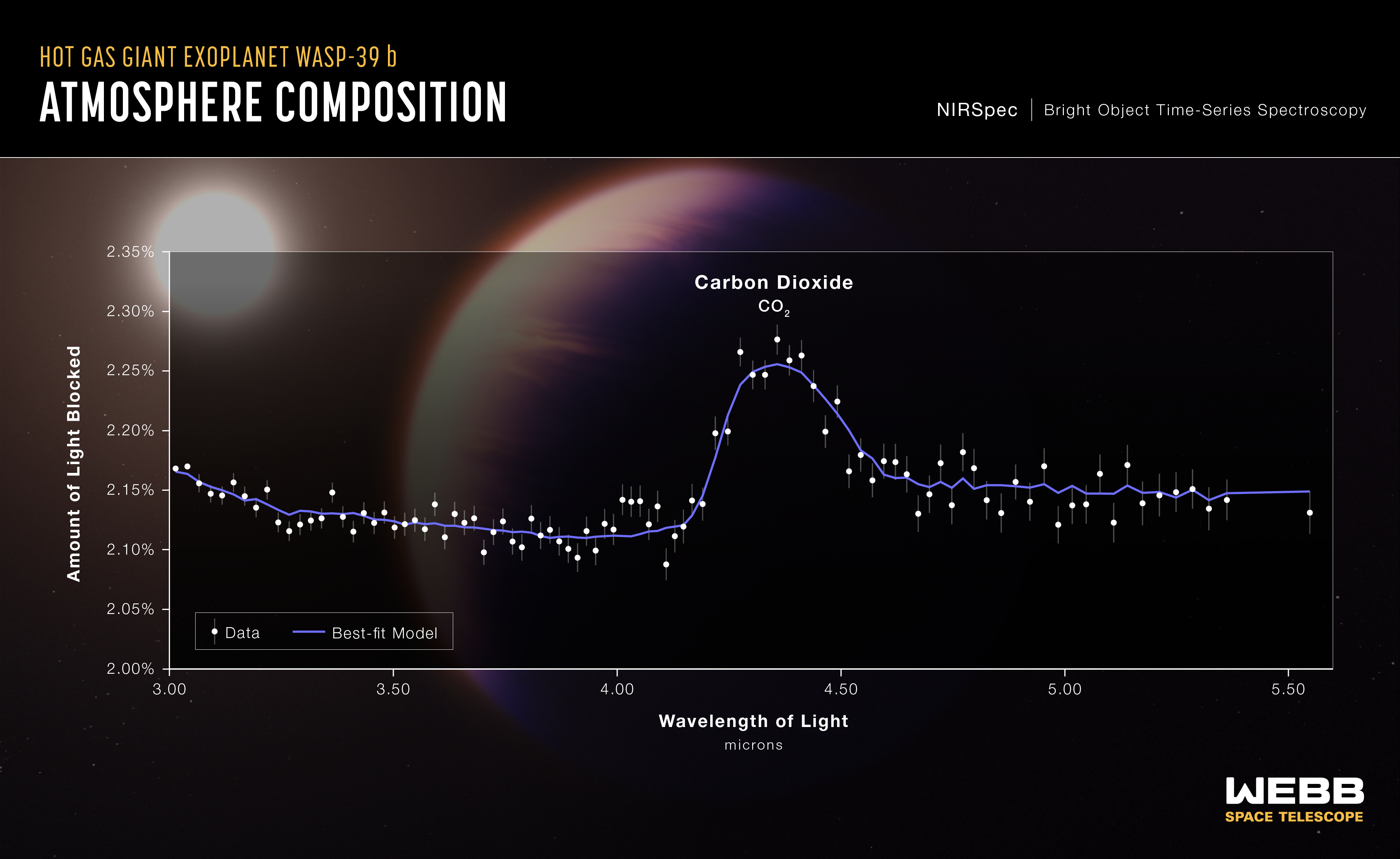
25 August: The first clear evidence for carbon dioxide in the atmosphere of an exoplanet is revealed by the James Webb Space Telescope.

- 11 August – A bioengineered cornea made from pig's skin is shown to restore vision to blind people. It can be mass-produced and stored for up to two years, unlike donated human corneas that are scarce and must be used within two weeks.
- 12 August — The National Centers for Environmental Information publish a report, where they state an all-time record cold temperature occurred in Australia during the month. On October 7, 2022, Zack Labe, a climate scientist for the NOAA GFDL releases a statement and a climate report from Berkeley Earth denying the all-time record cold temperature occurred saying, "There are still no areas of record cold so far in 2022." Labe's statement also denies the record cold temperatures in Brazil, reported by the National Institute of Meteorology in May 2022, a month before the official start of winter, was also not record cold temperatures.
- 13 August – Rocket Lab describes its self-funded plans in detail, first announced in early 2020, to send a probe to Venus, likely in 2023, to search for life in the planet's cloud layer, where other scientists reported the potential detection of biosignature-levels of phosphine in late 2020 and thereafter.
- ~14 August – As record-breaking heatwaves and droughts affect water supplies, rivers (along with shipping and nuclear reactor cooling), ecosystems, various global supply chains, health, and agriculture worldwide, in Europe, Spain domestically restricts e.g. air conditioning to defined temperature ranges, in the U.S., entities are required to provide plans to reduce their water usage, and China experiences large blackouts and experiments with cloud seeding among other measures, despite experts stating it would be "marginally effective" and possibly exacerbate problems. Several journalists of online newspapers have put these extreme weather events into the context of climate change adaptation (alongside highlighting of the importance of climate change mitigation).
- 15 August – A study on the food impacts of a nuclear war is published. It finds that even a small-scale conflict between India and Pakistan would decrease global average caloric production by 7%, while a full-scale U.S.-Russia nuclear conflict would result in a 90% loss, killing more than 5 billion people worldwide.

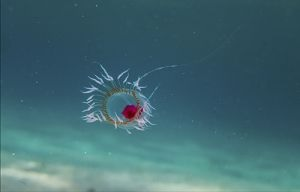
29 August: Scientists report the key molecular mechanisms of rejuvenation they found in a comparison of the newly presented genomes of the biologically immortal T. dohrnii and a similar but non-rejuvenating jellyfish.

- 16 August – A university reports the release of 'Quad-SDK' which may be the first open source full-stack software for large agile four-legged robots, compatible with the ROS.
- 17 August
  - A report by Global Forest Watch, using new data, concludes that the amount of tree cover being burned has nearly doubled in the past 20 years.
  - The Nadir crater, likely the result of a second, smaller asteroid that struck around the same time as the Chicxulub impact, is identified and described by researchers.
  - Geologists warn that the world is "woefully underprepared" for a massive volcanic eruption. They estimate a one-in-six chance of a magnitude seven explosion in the next one hundred years.
  - Researchers report the development of floating artificial leaves for light-driven hydrogen and syngas fuel production. The lightweight, flexible devices are scalable and can float on water similar to lotus leaves.
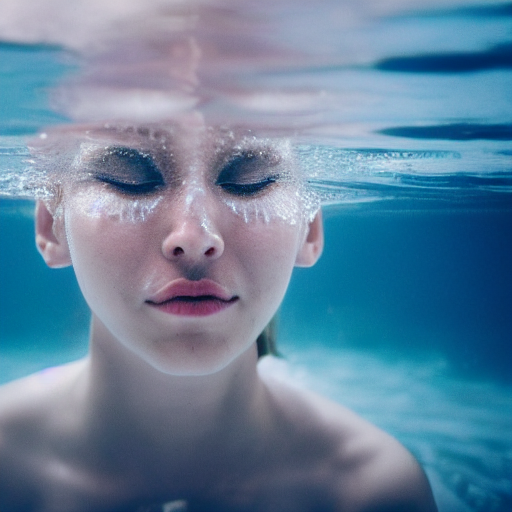

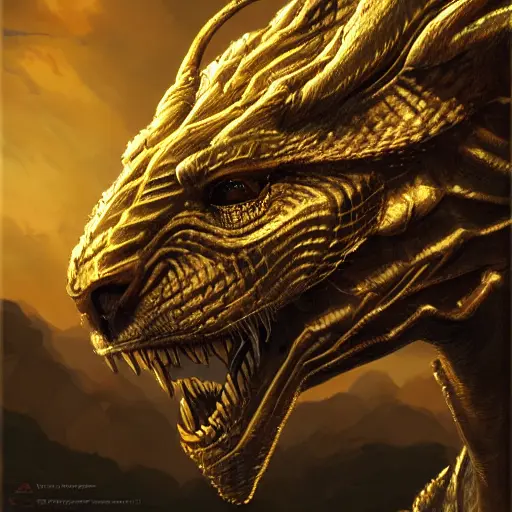
~August: Artificial intelligence art becomes highly sophisticated and popular and starts winning art prizes. The two images are made via the open source Stable Diffusion.

- 18 August
  - A weak spot in the spike protein of SARS-CoV-2 is described by researchers, which an antibody fragment called VH Ab6 can attach to, potentially neutralising all major variants of the virus. On 11 August, researchers report a single antibody, SP1-77, that could potentially neutralize all known variants of the virus via a novel mechanism, not by not preventing the virus from binding to ACE2 receptors but by blocking it from fusing with host cells' membranes.
  - Multiple gene editing of soybean is shown to improve photosynthesis and boost yields by 20%.
  - A researcher reports that the social media app TikTok adds a keylogger to its, on iOS essentially unavoidable, in-app browser in iOS, which allows its Chinese company to gather, for example, passwords, credit card details, and everything else that is typed into websites opened from taps on any external links within the app. Shortly after the report, the company claims such capabilities are only used for debugging-types of purposes. To date, it has largely not been investigated which and to which extent (other) apps have capacities for such or similar data-collection.
  - A university reports the development of an invisible coating for fireproof wood.
- 20 August – A GBD systematic analysis reports the (non)progress on cancer and its causes during the 2010-19 decade, with ~44% of all cancer deaths in 2019 – or ~4.5 M deaths or ~105 million lost DALYs – due to known clearly preventable risk factors (contributions), led by smoking, alcohol use and high BMI.
- 22 August
  - A university reports the development of a driver isolation framework to protect operating system kernels, primarily the monolithic Linux kernel which gets ~80,000 commits/year to its drivers, from defects and vulnerabilities in device drivers, with the Mars Research Group developers describing this lack of isolation as one of the main factors undermining kernel security.
  - Scientists demonstrate that tACS brain stimulation can, depending on the frequency, for one month improve (either) short-term memory or long-term memory in 65–88-years-old people.
  - Scientists report a so far unique and unknown feature of material VO_{2} – it can "remember" previous external stimuli (via structural rather than electronic states), with potential for e.g. data storage.
  - A university reports the first successful transplantation of an organoid into a human, first announced on 7 July, with the underlying study being published in February.
- 23 August
  - A study reports that look-alike humans have genetic similarities, sharing genes affecting not only the face but also some phenotypes of physique and behavior, also indicating that (their) differences in the epigenome and microbiome contribute only modestly to human variability in facial appearance.
  - Researchers introduce the concept of 'false social reality' and substantiate it by showing that (a sample of) Americans widely underestimate general public support for climate change mitigation policies by a large margin.
  - A genome-wide association study meta-analysis reports genetic factors of, the so far uniquely human, language-related skills, in particular factors of differences in skill-levels of five tested traits. It e.g. identified association with neuroanatomy of a language-related brain area via neuroimaging correlation.
- 24 August
  - The dugong is declared extinct in China.
  - The first rail line entirely run by hydrogen-powered trains debuts in Germany.
- 25 August
  - The first clear evidence for carbon dioxide in the atmosphere of an exoplanet is revealed by the James Webb Space Telescope. The planet, WASP-39b, is a hot Jupiter located ~700 light years from Earth.
  - Researchers report the development of a highly effective CRISPR-Cas9 genome editing method without expensive viral vectors, enabling e.g. novel anti-cancer CAR-T cell therapies.
- 26 August – Researchers report the development of greenhouses (or solar modules) by a startup that generate electricity from a portion of the spectrum of sunlight, allowing spectra that interior plants use to pass through.
- 29 August
  - A study reports that in model animals, treatment with rapamycin – which typically has negative side-effects – for a limited timespan extended lifespan as much as life-long administration started at the same age and that it was most effective during early adulthood.
  - Scientists report the key molecular mechanisms of rejuvenation they found in a comparison of the newly presented genomes of the biologically immortal T. dohrnii and a similar but non-rejuvenating jellyfish, involving e.g. DNA replication and repair, and stem cell renewal.
  - After establishment of the Scientist Rebellion around March 2021, several researchers affiliated with the movement (six overall) argue for civil disobedience by colleagues in a commentary behind a paywall, hypothesizing that such may cause significant pro-climate net changes of public opinion due to "potential to cut through the myriad complexities and confusion" in the public, receiving substantial coverage by online text-based news media.
- 31 August
  - Scientists warn, in a follow-up paper to their 2021 study, that a third of tree species are threatened with extinction, showing how this will significantly alter the world's ecosystems, may negatively affect billions, and could get averted with "urgent actions". On 1 August, a study reports that over 60 years (1960–2019), "the global forest area has declined by 81.7 million ha", concluding higher income nations need to reduce imports of tropical forest-related products and help with theoretically forest-related socioeconomic development and international policies.
  - News outlets report artificial intelligence art has won the first place in a digital art competition. Such artistic imagery is generated using input consisting of text and sometimes images, usually including parameters such as artistic style (text-to-image generation). Around the time, an expert concludes that "AI art is everywhere right now", with even experts not knowing what it will mean, a news outlet establishes that "AI-generated art booms" and reports about issues of copyright and automation of professional artists, a news outlet investigates how online communities (e.g. their rules) confronted with many such artworks react, a news outlet raised concerns over deepfakes, a magazine highlights possibilities of enabling "new forms of artistic expression", an editorial notes that it may be seen as a welcome "augmentation of human capability". Moreover, additional functionalities – such as enabling the use of user-provided concepts (like an object or a style) learned from few images for novel personalized art generated from the associated word/s (2 Aug) or expanding beyond the borders of artistic images in the same style (31 Aug) – are reported. On 22 August, Stable Diffusion is released as free and open source software.

=== September ===
- 1 September
  - The James Webb Space Telescope takes its first direct images of a planet beyond the Solar System. The exoplanet, HIP 65426 b, is revealed in different bands of infrared light.
  - Neuroscientists report the discovery of the axo-ciliary synapse – communication between serotonergic axons and antenna-like primary cilia of CA1 pyramidal neurons that alters the neuron's epigenetic state in the nucleus.
  - Scientists elaborate a need for an evidence-based reform of regulation of genetically modified crops (moving from regulation based on characteristics of the development-process to characteristics of the product) in a paywalled article.
- 2 September – A first spatiotemporal map reveals key insights about axolotl brain regeneration.
- 5 September – Researchers report the development of remote controlled cyborg cockroaches functional if moving to sunlight for recharging.
- 6 September – The U.S. Department of Agriculture approves a new purple tomato, genetically modified to alter its colour and enhance its nutritional quality.
- 7 September – A new malaria vaccine developed by the University of Oxford is shown to be ~80% effective at preventing the disease.
- 8 September – A study adds to the accumulating research indicating postexposure antiviral TIPs could be an effective countermeasure that reduces COVID-19 transmission. In September, India and China approve the two first nasal COVID-19 vaccines which may (as boosters) also reduce transmission (sterilizing immunity).
- 9 September
  - A study describes how multiple tipping points in the climate system could be triggered if global warming exceeds 1.5 °C.
  - Scientists report a change in gene TKTL1 as a key factor of recent brain evolution and difference of modern humans to (other) apes and Neanderthals, related to neocortex-neurogenesis. Some of the scientists reported a similar ARHGAP11B mutation in 2016.
  - News outlets report about a study that describes a way by which geothermal power plants could store their energy within their reservoirs for dispatch to (better) help manage intermittency of solar and wind.
  - China reports the discovery of Changesite–(Y), a new mineral from lunar samples containing helium-3, widely seen as a potential fuel for fusion reactors.
- 12 September – A study investigates funding allocations for public investment in energy research, development and demonstration. It provides insights about potential past impacts of drivers, that may be relevant to adjusting (or facilitating) "investment in clean energy" "to come close to achieving meaningful global decarbonization", suggesting advancement of impactful "coopetition".
- 13 September
  - A study reports results indicating COVID-19 may significantly increase risk for Alzheimer's disease, similar to prior studies about long-term impacts besides long COVID on cardiovascular outcomes, diabetes, neurologic sequelae, mental health disorders, and general future mortality after COVID-19, including specific types of sequelae less commonly seen in other viral illnesses.
  - The United in Science 2022 report is published by the WMO, summarizing latest climate science-related updates and assessing recent climate change mitigation progress as "going in the wrong direction".
- 14 September
  - A new deep learning technique enables year-round measurements of sea ice thickness in the Arctic.
  - A research report by NewsGuard indicates there is a high level of online misinformation delivered – to a mainly young user base – with TikTok, whose usage is increasing.
  - The WHO joins health associations and scientists in calling for a global fossil fuel non-proliferation treaty to protect lives of current and future generations.

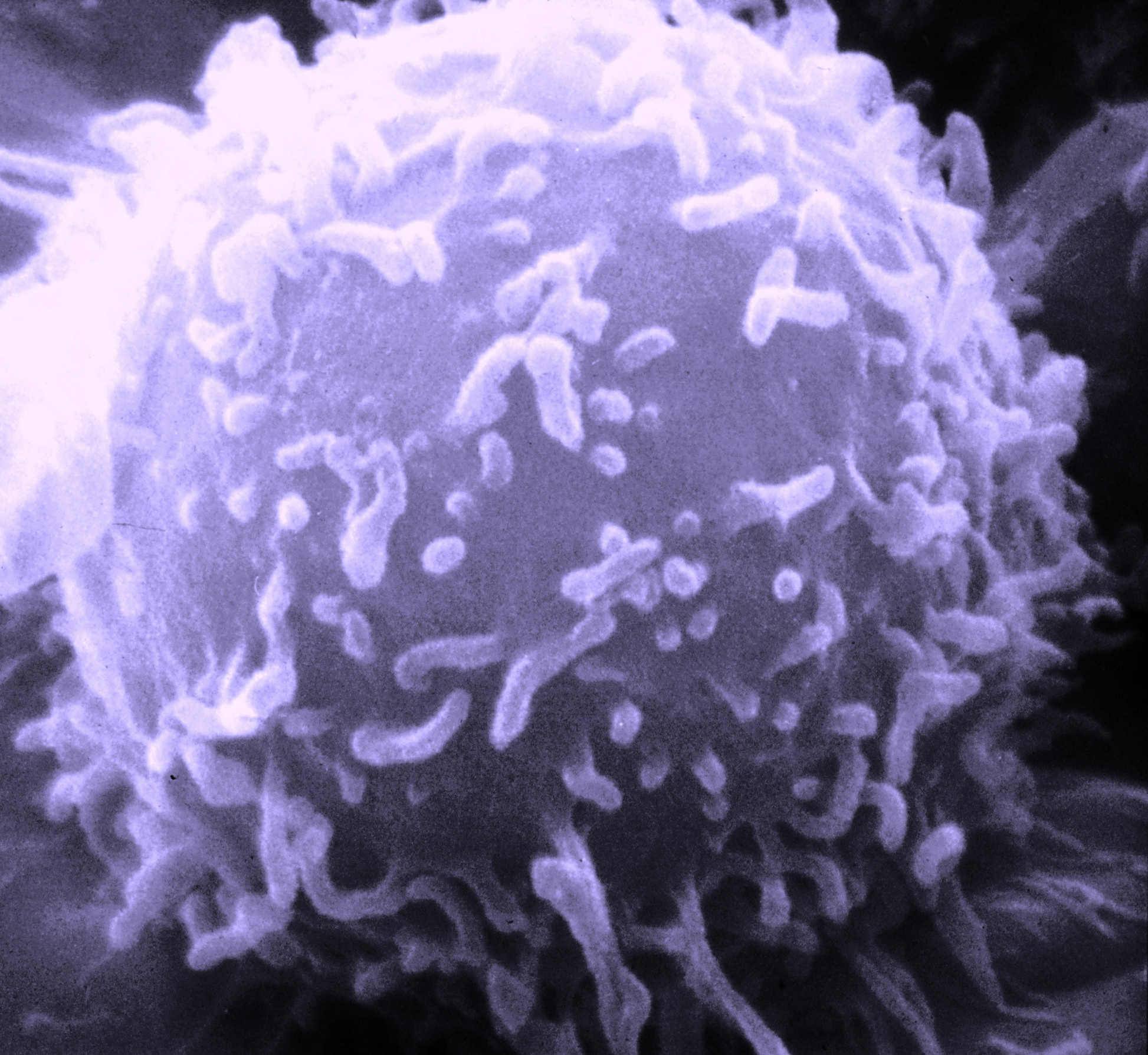
15 September: Researchers describe a way by which the aging of select immune system T cells can be prevented or slowed down.

- 15 September
  - A geoengineering plan to refreeze the North and South Poles by spraying sulphur dioxide into the atmosphere, using a fleet of 125 military air-to-air refuelling tankers, is proposed by scientists.
  - A study shows the microbiome, on the level of strains, co-diversified in parallel to phylogenies (heritability from ancestry). The findings may be of relevance to microbiome interventions (such as probiotics) and for adjusting therapies to populations.
  - The second largest cryptocurrency, Ethereum, switches from the proof-of-work (electricity consumption for validation) to the proof-of-stake (staked holdings for validation) algorithm, which cuts its large respective electricity consumption.
  - Researchers describe a way by which the aging of select immune system T cells can be prevented or is slowed down, with relevance to life extension and making vaccines more durable.

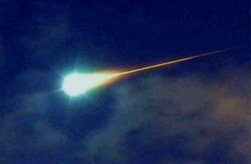
20 September: Astronomers report in a preprint the discovery of a candidate fourth interstellar object, CNEOS 2017-03-09.

- 19 September
  - A study indicates a substantial decline in dinosaur biodiversity millions of years before the Cretaceous-Paleogene extinction event.
  - Scientists report geochemical modeling results that increase confidence for the ocean of Saturn's moon Enceladus being habitable or meeting abiogenesis-requirements.

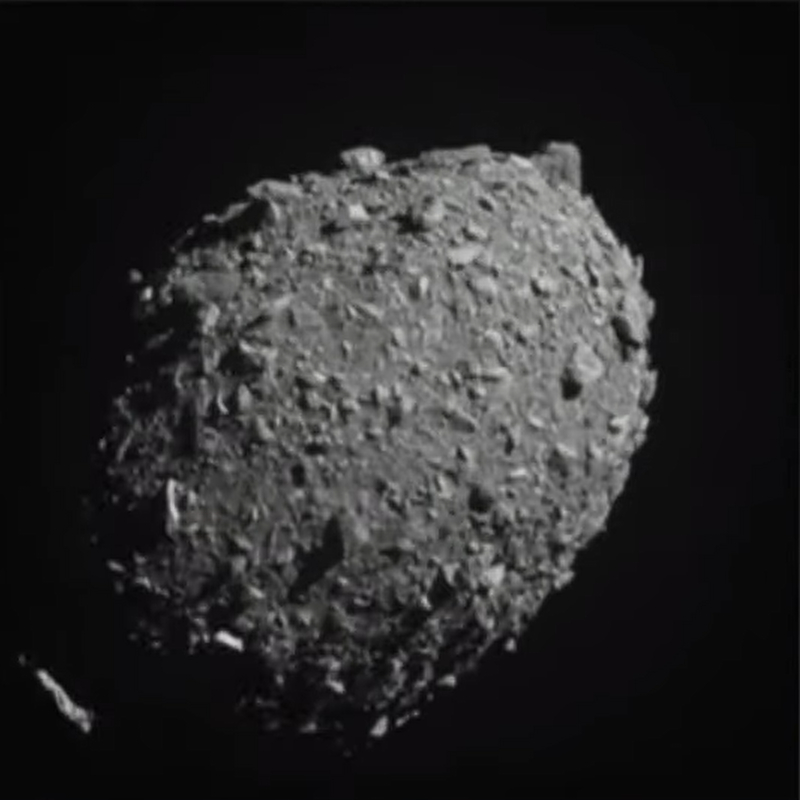
26 September: NASA's DART crashes into the asteroid Dimorphos in a first test of potential planetary defense.

- 20 September – Scientists who reported the earliest known interstellar object, CNEOS 2014-01-08, and members of The Galileo Project, report the discovery of an additional candidate interstellar meteor, CNEOS 2017-03-09, in a preprint using the same fireball catalog. They find that the implied material strength of the two objects suggests that interstellar meteors "come from a population with material strength characteristically higher than meteors originating from within the solar system".
- 21 September – Engineers report the development of autonomous 3D-printing drones for construction and repair.
- 22 September
  - Nanoengineers report the development of biocompatible microalgae hybrid microrobots for active drug-delivery in the lungs (22 Sep.) and the gastrointestinal tract (GT) (28 Sep.). The microrobots are related to medical nanobots and proved effective in tests with mice. A separate team reports the development of 'RoboCap', a robotic drug delivery capsule that enhances drug absorption by tunneling through the mucus layer in the GT (28 Sep.).
  - Around September, news outlets report about deployment, research and development of novel military drone technology in the Russo-Ukrainian War in 2022, including demining drones, self-repurposed commercial/hobby drones (including via a hackathon), reconnaissance microdrones, kamikaze drones, bomb-dropping modified drones, and countermeasures such as electronic ones.
  - Scientists caution about potential spillover of bat sarbecovirus Khosta-2 resistant to COVID-19 vaccines and also using ACE2, suggesting it or something like it could recombine with SARS-CoV-2 as a new threat.
- 23 September – Astronomers report that GJ 1252b, an Earth-sized planet orbiting an M-class red dwarf, appears to have no atmosphere, which may reduce the chances of life emerging in such systems.
- 26 September
  - Jupiter makes its closest approach to Earth since 1963.
  - NASA's DART crashes into the asteroid Dimorphos in a first test of potential planetary defense. Success of path alteration is reported on 11 October.
  - A study invalidates the common argument as is for high medication costs that research and development investments are reflected in and necessitate the treatment costs, finding no correlation for investments in drugs (for cases where transparency was sufficient) and their costs.
  - News outlets report, based on CDC reports and health officials, that the 2022 monkeypox outbreak appears to be receding and/or passed a peak while also reporting that its elimination within the U.S. and globally is unlikely (or the outbreak being "far from finished").
- 27 September – A study finds that drinking two to three cups of ground, instant, or decaffeinated coffee each day is associated with a longer lifespan and lower risk of cardiovascular disease compared with avoiding coffee.
- 28 September
  - A breakthrough in treating Alzheimer's disease is reported by pharmaceutical companies Eisai and Biogen, using a drug called lecanemab, which is designed to remove beta-amyloid proteins from the brain.
  - A study indicates cancer risk from chronic circadian disruption is caused via body-temperature-related heat shock factor 1.
  - Researchers report the discovery of hemoglycin, the first space polymer of amino acids found in meteorites.
- 29 September
  - In two studies, scientists report a novel way of cancer screening – detecting tumor-associated mycobiomes. It could be used in synergy with other biomarkers such as of bacterial microbiomes.
  - A study estimates the disproportionality of drivers of climate change by wealth and concludes that to total emissions, investments of the global top 1% are far more important than their consumption and that the pollution gap is larger within countries than between countries.
  - A study adds to the accumulating research showing that oil and gas industry methane emissions are much larger than thought.
- 30 September
  - The discovery of "super neurons" in the entorhinal cortex of people over age 80 who show exceptional episodic memory is reported.
  - Scientists caution about potential future spillover of SHFV.

== Deaths ==
- 26 July – James Lovelock, English environmentalist (Gaia hypothesis) and futurist (b. 1919)
- 25 August – Kurt Gottfried, Austrian-born American physicist.
- 2 September – Frank Drake, American astronomer and astrophysicist (Drake equation), designer of the Arecibo message (b. 1930)

== See also ==
- 2020s#Global goals and issues
- Category:Science events
- Category:Science timelines
- List of emerging technologies
- List of years in science
