= 2020s in spaceflight =

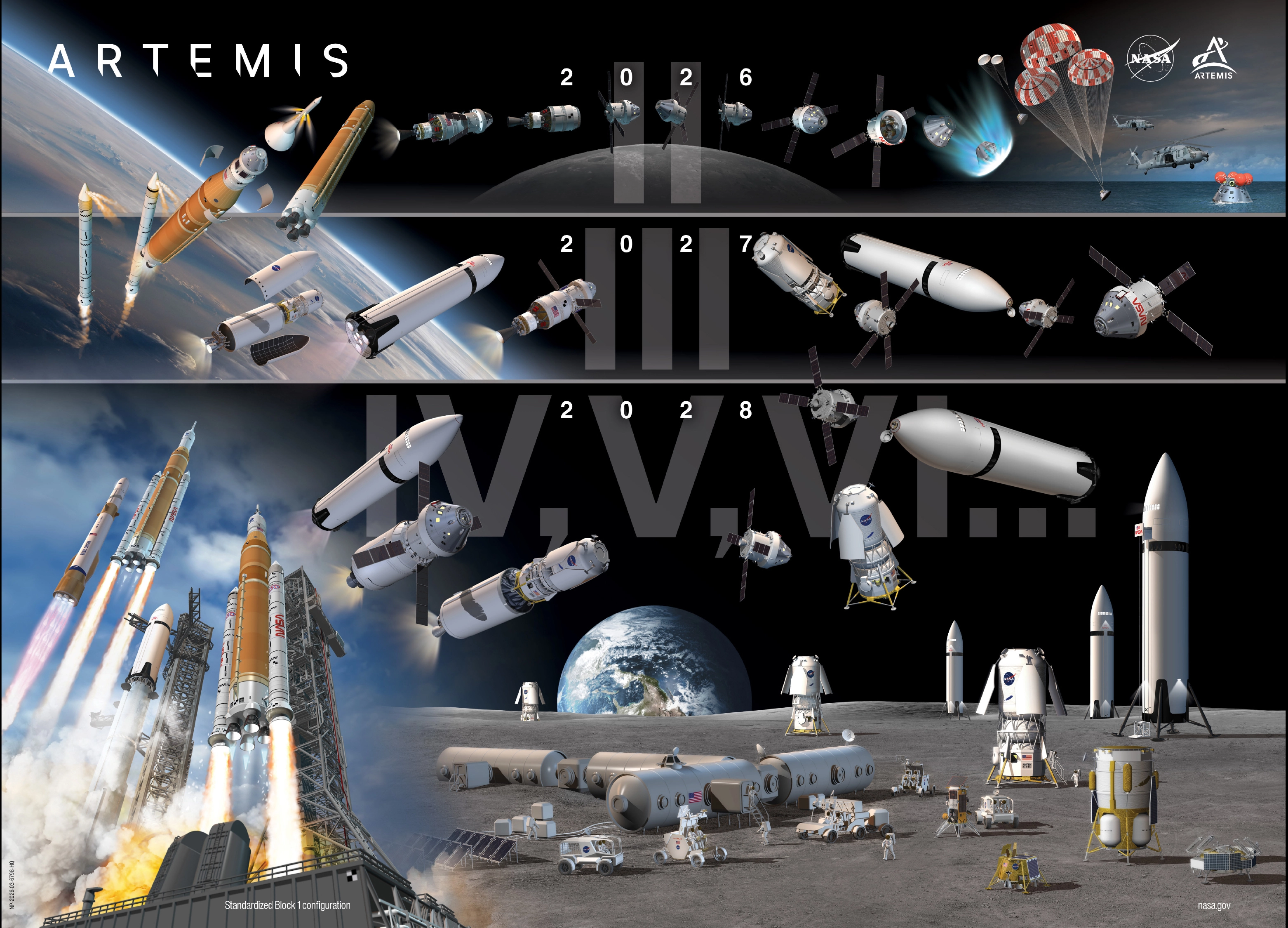
- NASA plans to reestablish a human presence on the Moon during the 2020s.

This article documents expected notable spaceflight events during the 2020s.

== Overview ==
The global trend towards reuse and gradual cost reduction regarding access to orbit is expected to continue in this decade. Since 2023, SpaceX has been testing its fully reusable Starship with orbital-velocity missions. The Vulcan Centaur, intended by United Launch Alliance to replace its more expensive predecessors, launched for the first time in early 2024. After delays, Ariane 6 replaced the more expensive Ariane 5 with its maiden flight in July. The following year, Blue Origin launched New Glenn twice in January and November respectively, and LandSpace launched Zhuque-3 for the first time in December.

Within the realm of planetary science, Mars remains a focus for missions to other planets conducted by space agencies, with three missions launched in 2020 (by China, the United Arab Emirates and the United States), ESCAPADE launched in 2025 and at least one mission planned for 2026 and 2028. Japan and China plan to retrieve samples from Mars and Phobos, respectively, by 2031, in missions launched during the 2020s.

Under the Artemis program, NASA plans a return of humans to the Moon no earlier than 2028. The first uncrewed launch of the Space Launch System happened in 2022, and the first crewed launch, a flight around the Moon, occurred in April 2026. A crewed exploration of Mars could follow in the mid-2030s. SpaceX, a private company, had previously announced plans to land humans on Mars in the 2020s, with the long-term goal of enabling the colonization of Mars; however, in early 2026, Elon Musk stated that SpaceX was currently focused on the Moon rather than Mars.

India plans to launch its first crewed flight with a spacecraft called Gaganyaan on an Indian GSLV Mark III rocket in 2027. The mission would make India the fourth nation to launch a crewed spaceflight after Russia, the US and China. India also plans to launch its second Mars probe since the Mars Orbiter Mission, the Mars Lander Mission, sometime in the 2020s.

The James Webb Space Telescope was launched in late 2021 and became active in mid-2022. NASA launched the Nancy Grace Roman Space Telescope in August 2026; it which will have a field of view 100 times larger than that of the Hubble Space Telescope once active.

NASA's NEO Surveyor, scheduled to launch no later than June 2028, is expected to be capable of detecting at least 90% of near-Earth objects larger than 140 meters (460 ft), a goal mandated by the US Congress in 2005.

The number of small satellites launched annually was expected to grow to around one thousand (2018 estimate), mainly communication satellites in large constellations but launches quickly exceeded this estimate, mainly due to the rapid deployment of the Starlink and OneWeb constellations. From 2020 to 2022, around 3500 Starlink satellites and 500 satellites by OneWeb were launched.

The number of total satellites reached 10,000 for the first time in 2024.

== Event timeline ==
- NASA's Mars 2020 mission, which includes the Perseverance rover, was successfully launched on 30 July 2020 to study the habitability of Mars in preparation for future human missions.
- The Chang'e 5 successfully landed on the surface of the Moon in 2020.
- On 16 September 2021, SpaceX launched Inspiration4. It was the first orbital launch of an all-private crew, including the first person with a prosthesis to go to space.
- The James Webb Space Telescope was successfully launched on 25 December 2021. On 12 July 2022, the first full-colour images captured were released to the public which included Webb's First Deep Field and others.
- NASA's Artemis I mission to the Moon launched on 16 November 2022 to test the Space Launch System rocket.
- ESA's Jupiter Icy Moons Explorer was launched on 14 April 2023.
- Intuitive Machines' lunar lander Odysseus was launched on 15 February 2024 and landed on the Moon a week afterward, becoming the first American spacecraft to perform a soft-landing on the Moon since Apollo 17 in 1972.
- The world's first private spacewalk was conducted on 12 September 2024 by billionaire entrepreneur and now-NASA administrator Jared Isaacman on the Polaris Dawn mission, a followup to Inspiration4.
- On 7 October 2024, the Hera spacecraft was launched successfully. It will arrive at the asteroid Didymos in 2026 after a Mars flyby the year before, where it will study the effects of the Double Asteroid Redirection Test.
- On 13 October 2024, SpaceX achieved the first successful return and capture of a Super Heavy booster from Starship, the largest and most powerful rocket to have ever flown.
- On 14 October 2024, NASA launched the Europa Clipper on 14 October 2024, which will study the Jovian moon Europa while in orbit around Jupiter and arrive in April 2030.
- On 2 March 2025, the company Firefly Aerospace became the first company to conduct a fully-successful soft landing (Intuitive Machines' Odysseus of the year prior landed at an incline of 30 degrees) on the Moon.
- The NASA Martian spacecraft mission ESCAPADE launched on 13 November 2025, which will arrive at Mars in 2027.
- NASA launched Artemis II, the first crewed NASA mission since 2011 and the first crewed deep space mission since 1972 on 1 April 2026, with the mission lasting approximately nine days before splashdown in the Pacific Ocean on 10 April.
- India aims to conduct its first human spaceflight, named Gaganyaan, sometime in 2027.
- NASA plans to send "the first woman and the next man" to the south pole region of the Moon via Artemis IV no earlier than 2028.
