= SMACS 0723 =

Galaxy cluster in the constellation Volans

SMACS J0723.3–7327
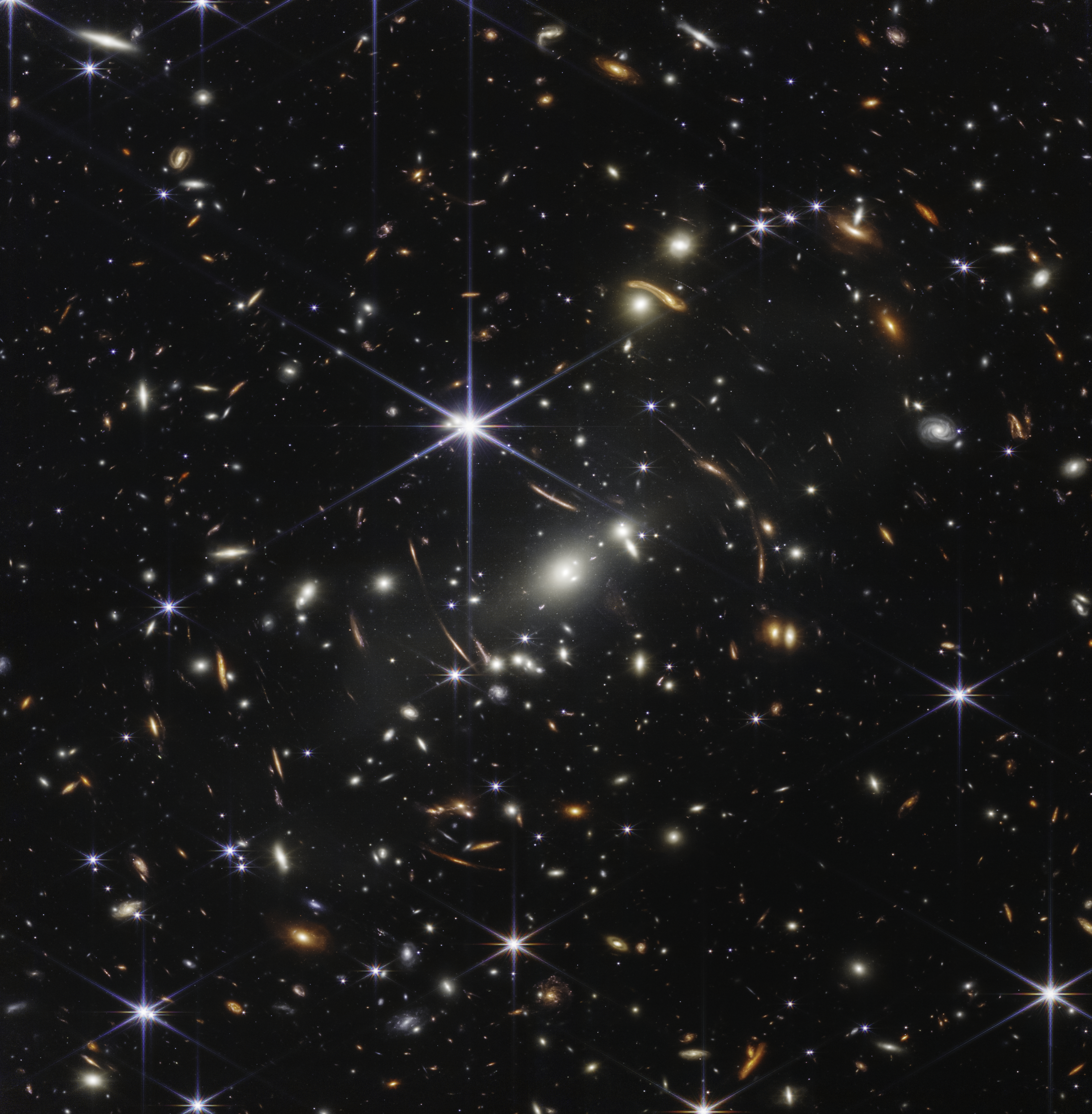
- Infrared image from the James Webb Space Telescope, its first deep field showing gravitational lensing of distant galaxies

Observation data (Epoch J2000)
- Constellation: Volans
- Right ascension: 07^{h} 23^{m} 19.5^{s}
- Declination: −73° 27′ 15.6″
- Redshift: 0.390
- Distance: about 4 billion light-years

Other designations
- PSZ1 G284.97-23.69, PLCKESZ G284.99-23.70

SMACS J0723.3–7327, commonly referred to as SMACS 0723, is a galaxy cluster about 4 billion light-years from Earth, within the southern constellation of Volans (RA/Dec = 110.8375, −73.4391667). It is a patch of sky visible from the Southern Hemisphere on Earth and often observed by the Hubble Space Telescope and other telescopes in search of the deep past. It was the target of the first full-color image to be unveiled by the James Webb Space Telescope (JWST), imaged using NIRCam, with spectra included, showing objects lensed by the cluster with redshifts implying they are 13.1 billion years old. The cluster has been previously observed by the Hubble Space Telescope (HST) as part of the Southern MAssive Cluster Survey (SMACS), as well as Planck and Chandra.

Left: image taken by Hubble Space Telescope (2017)
Right: image taken by James Webb Space Telescope (2022)
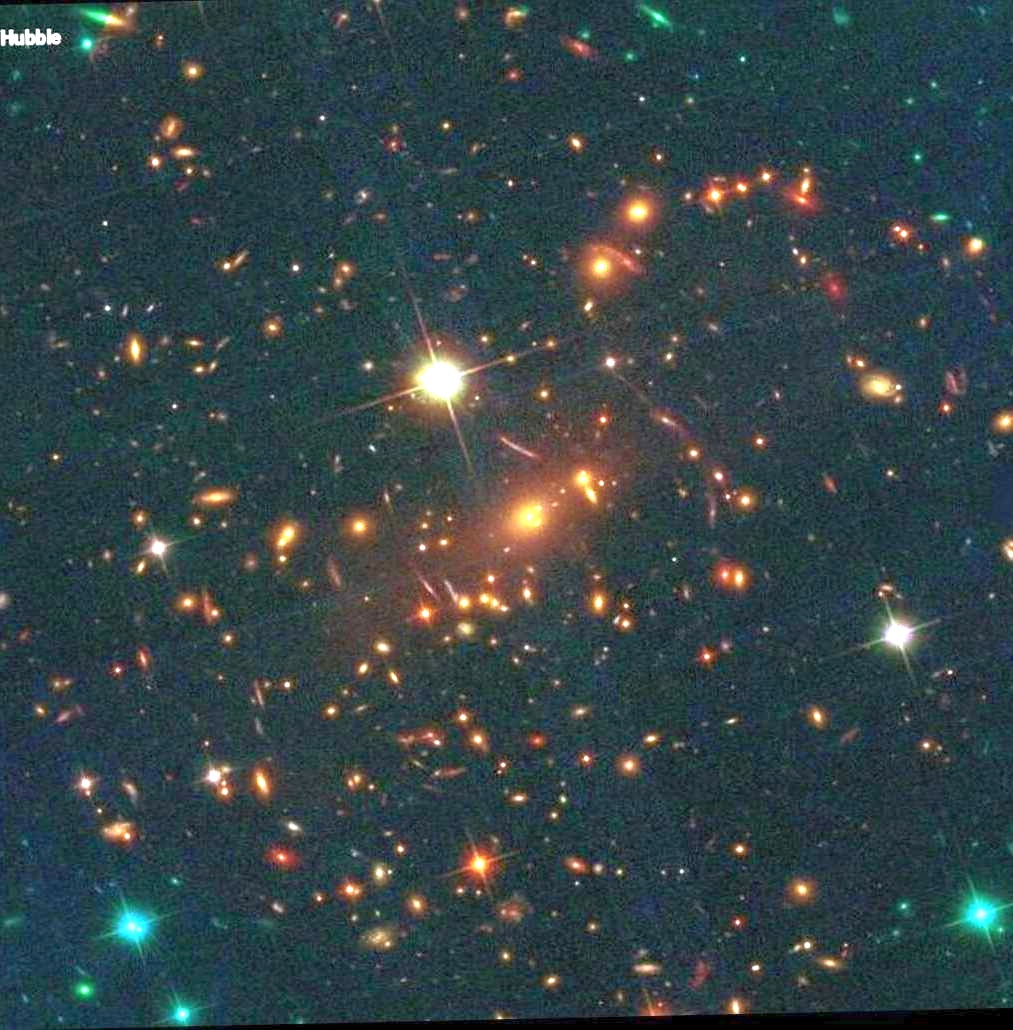
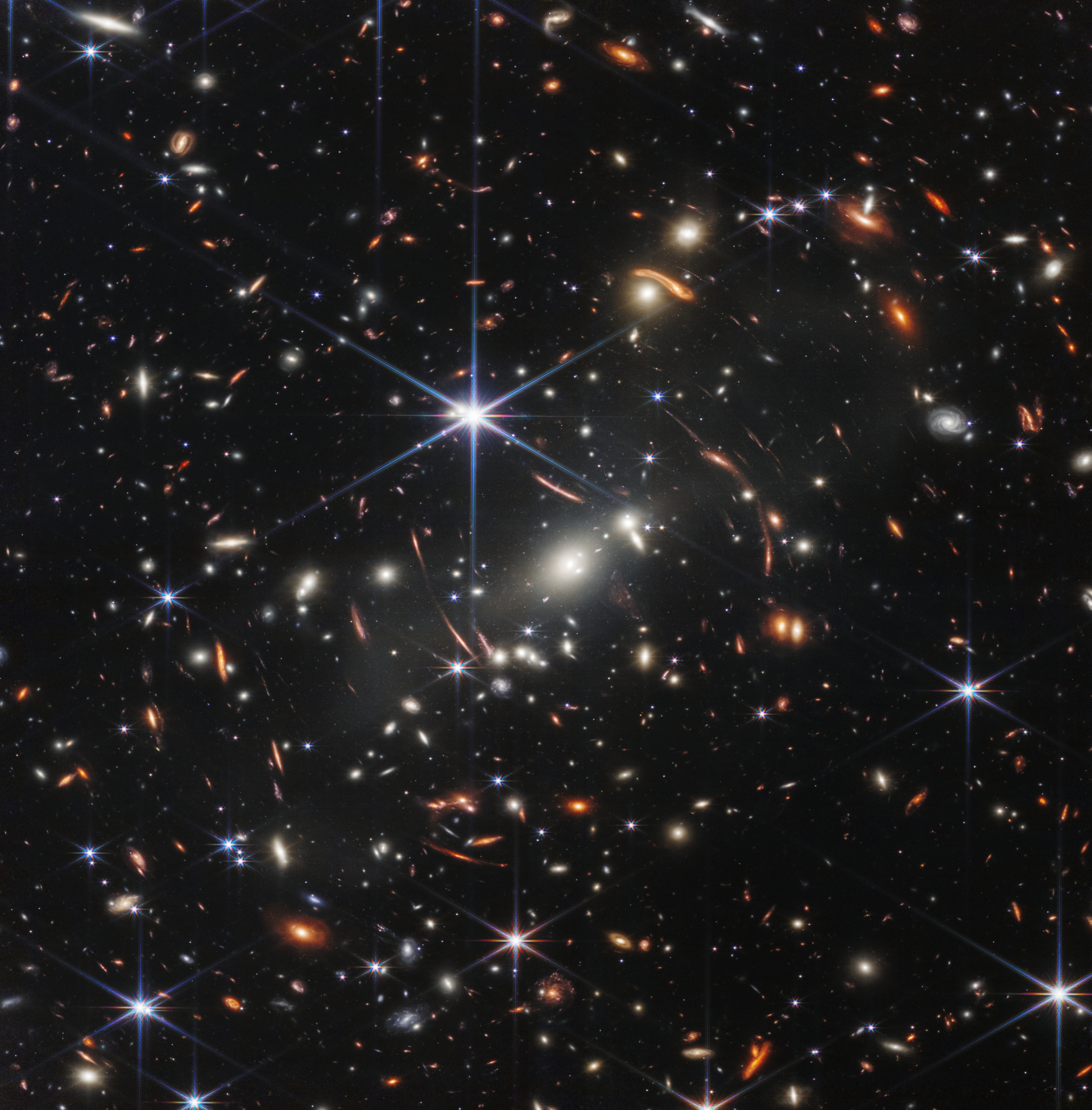
Deep Field – Galaxy cluster SMACS J0723.3-7327

In 2022, in the field gravitationally lensed by SMAC 0723, some of the then most ancient massive star clusters were discovered in a lensed galaxy called the "Sparkler Galaxy".
