= SN 2020tlf =

Type II supernova that occurred 120 million light years away in the galaxy NGC 5731

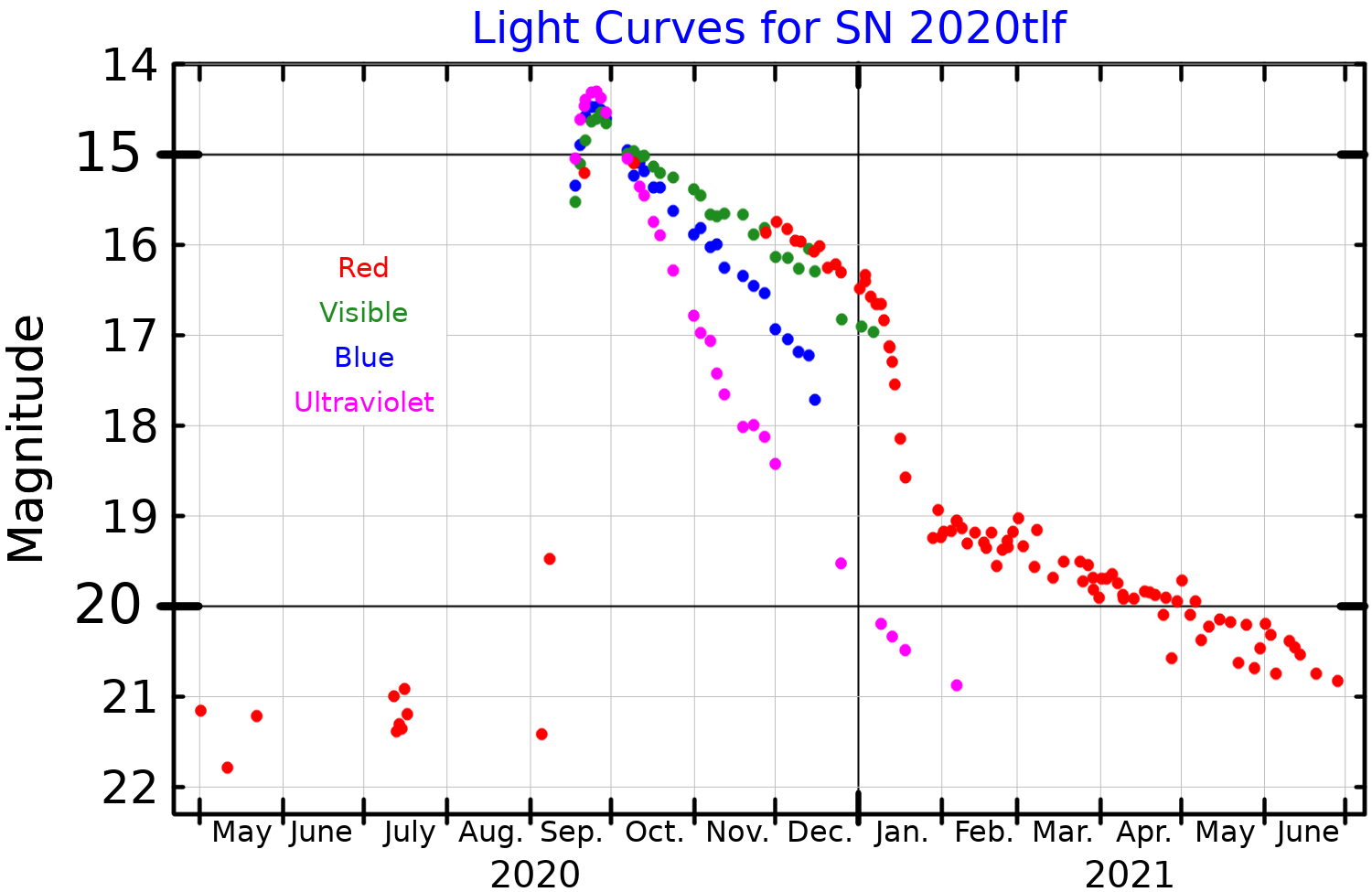
- Light curves for SN 2020tlf in four photometric bands, plotted from data published by Jacobson-Galán et al. (2022)
- Event type: Type IIn
- Constellation: Boötes
- Right ascension: 14^{h} 40^{m} 10.03^{s}
- Declination: 42° 46′ 39.45″
- Epoch: J2000
- Distance: 36.8±1.29 million pc
- Redshift: 0.008463±0.0003
- Host: NGC 5731
- Progenitor type: Red supergiant
- Peak apparent magnitude: 15.89

SN 2020tlf was a Type II supernova that occurred 120 million light years away in the galaxy NGC 5731. The supernova marked the first time that a red supergiant star had been observed before, during, and after the event, being observed up to 130 days before. The progenitor star was between 10 and 12 solar masses.

== Observations ==
The star was first observed by the Pan-STARRS telescope in the summer of 2020, with other telescopes such as ATLAS also observing it. It was initially believed that red supergiants were quiet before their demise; however, SN 2020tlf was observed emitting bright, intense radiation and ejecting massive amounts of gaseous material. Observations were also made throughout the electromagnetic spectrum, such as in the X-ray, ultraviolet, infrared and radio wave spectrums.
