= Webb's First Deep Field =

First operational image from NASA's James Webb Space Telescope

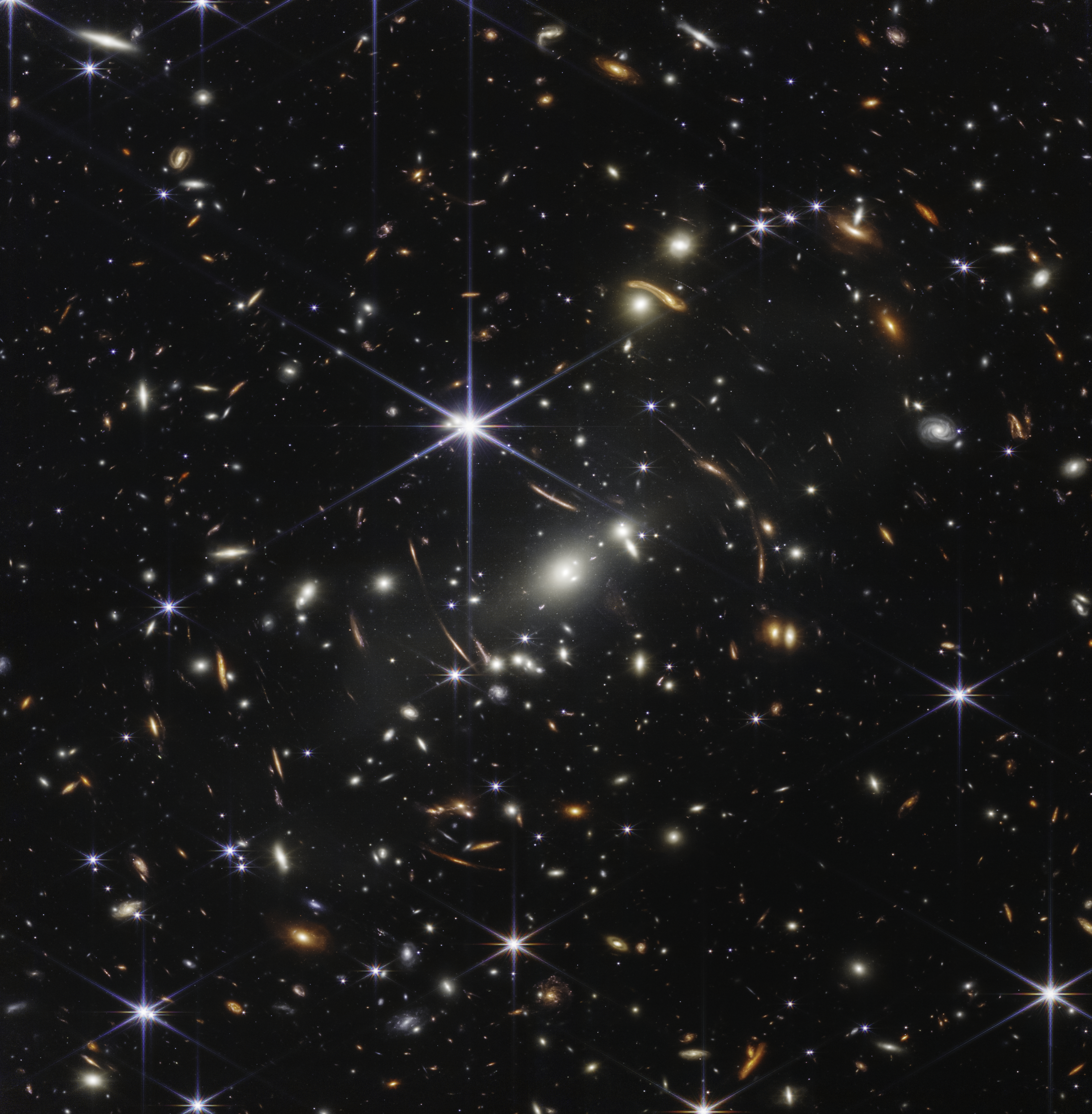
Webb's First Deep Field

Webb's First Deep Field is the first operational image taken by the James Webb Space Telescope (JWST). The deep-field photograph, which covers a tiny area of sky visible from the Southern Hemisphere, is centered on SMACS 0723, a galaxy cluster in the constellation of Volans. Thousands of galaxies are visible in the image, some as old as 13 billion years. It is the highest-resolution image of the early universe ever taken. Captured by the telescope's Near-Infrared Camera (NIRCam), the image combined different images taken with multiple filters. The image was revealed to the public by NASA on 11 July 2022.

== Background ==
The James Webb Space Telescope is a space telescope operated by NASA and designed primarily to conduct infrared astronomy. Launched in December 2021, the spacecraft has been in a halo orbit around the second Sun–Earth Lagrange point (L_{2}), about 1.5 million kilometers (900,000 mi) from Earth, since January 2022. At L_{2}, the gravitational pull of the Sun combines with the gravitational pull of the Earth to produce an orbital period that matches Earth's, and the Earth and Sun remain co-aligned (as seen from that point) as the Earth and the spacecraft orbit the Sun together.

Webb's First Deep Field was taken by the telescope's Near-Infrared Camera (NIRCam) and is a composite produced from images at different wavelengths, totalling 12.5 hours of exposure time.

SMACS 0723 is a galaxy cluster visible from Earth's Southern Hemisphere, and has often been examined by Hubble and other telescopes in search of the deep past.

== Scientific results ==
The image shows the galaxy cluster SMACS 0723 as it appeared 4.6 billion years ago, covering an area of sky with an angular size of 2.4 arcminutes, approximately equal to a grain of sand held at arm's length. Many of the objects in the image have undergone notable redshift due to the expansion of space over the extreme distance traveled by the light radiating from them. The redshifts of nearly 200 of these objects have been measured to date, with the highest redshift measured at 8.498.

The combined mass of the galaxy cluster acts as a gravitational lens, magnifying and distorting the images of much more distant galaxies behind it. Webb's NIRCam brought the distant galaxies into sharp focus, revealing tiny, faint structures that had never been seen before, including star clusters and diffuse features.

== Diffraction spikes in the photo ==
The Webb telescope's mirror is composed of 18 individual mirrors, each having a hexagonal rim, rather than the round rim typically used in telescopes.

The six diffraction spikes from the rim along with the two horizontal diffraction spikes from the struts, for a total of eight diffraction spikes. The colors of the spikes correspond to the colors of the rim edges and color of struts.

The six bright and two fainter spikes around the point sources of light in the photo are an artifact created by the physical limitations of the telescope. The six bright spikes are a result of diffraction from the mirror's edges. The mirror is composed of 18 individual units, each having the shape of a regular hexagon. The hexagonal rim of the units that make up the telescope's large mirror give rise to the six spikes. Telescopes with circular mirrors/lenses don't have such spikes (in lieu of spikes, diffraction from circular rims creates a pattern of concentric rings called Airy discs).

The two additional spikes are a result of diffraction from the struts holding the telescope's secondary mirror in front of the main mirror. As shown in the figure on the right, diffraction from the three struts creates six spikes, but four of these are designed to co-align with the spikes created from the diffraction caused by the rim. This leaves the two faint horizontal spikes visible in the photo.

== Significance ==
=== Deepest image of the Universe ===
On 11 July 2022, JWST delivered the deepest sharp infrared image of the universe to date. Webb's First Deep Field is the first full false-color image from the JWST, and the highest-resolution infrared view of the universe yet captured. The image reveals thousands of galaxies in a tiny sliver of the universe, with Webb's sharp near-infrared view bringing out faint structures in extremely distant galaxies, offering the most detailed view of the early universe to date. Thousands of galaxies, which include the faintest objects ever observed in the infrared, have appeared in Webb's view for the first time.

It was first revealed to the public during an event on 11 July 2022 by U.S. President Joe Biden.

== Image development ==
The James Webb Space Telescope is used to study the oldest galaxies and the possible origins of the universe. This requires a near-infrared (NIR) spectra because wavelengths of older galaxies are lengthened due to the outward expansion of the universe, causing them to appear redder than they actually are. The Near-Infrared Spectrograph (NIRSpec) is one of four instruments used on JWST, offering the flexibility to observe a wide range of astronomical targets using multi-object and integral field spectroscopy. Webb's First Deep Field is not what would be visible to the human eye, as JWST images more than only optical wavelengths. The telescope records data at multiple wavelengths using a series of filters, then assigns each wavelength a color. The image combines multiple near-infrared (NIRCam) and mid-infrared (MIRI) filters to produce a fabricated-color image representing infrared light.

== Comparison with the Hubble Space Telescope ==
JWST images provide sharper pictures of galaxies than those taken by the Hubble Space Telescope. The JWST required much less exposure time to take its image.

Deep Field – Galaxy cluster SMACS J0723.3-7327.
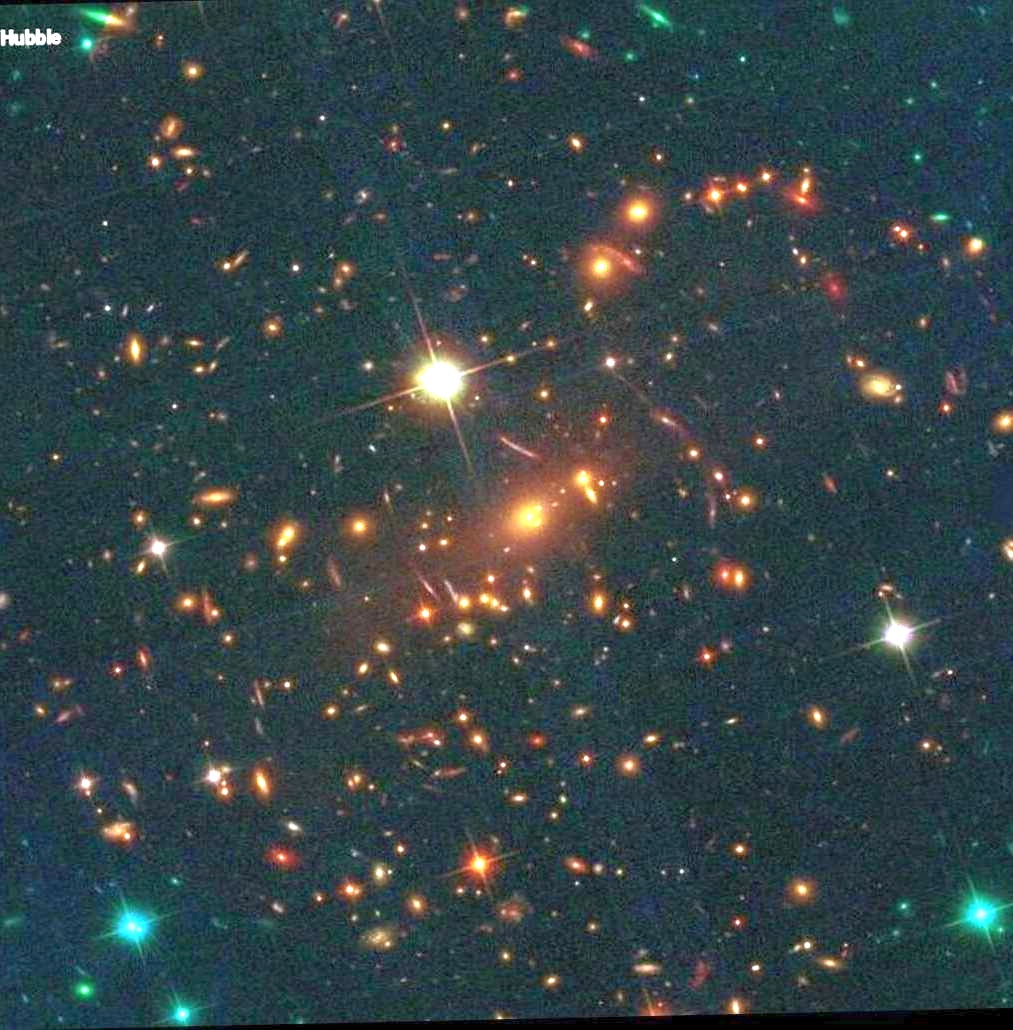
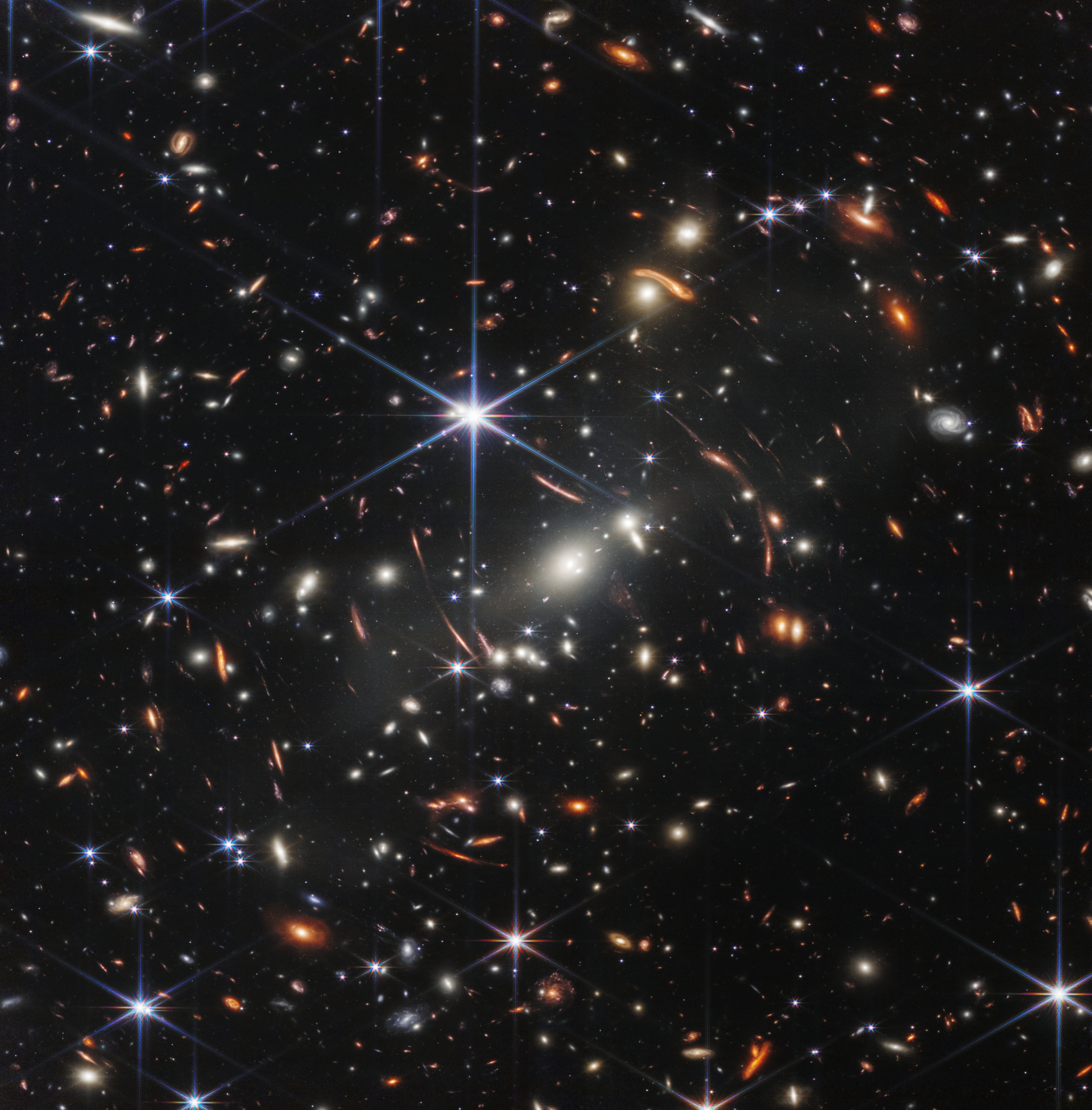
Left: image taken by the Hubble Space Telescope in 2017
Right: same image taken by the James Webb Space Telescope in 2022

== See also ==
- List of deep fields
