= The Galileo Project =

Search for extraterrestrial intelligence

Logo of The Galileo Project

The Galileo Project is an international scientific research project to search for extraterrestrial intelligence or extraterrestrial technology on and near Earth and to identify the nature of anomalous Unidentified Flying Objects/Unidentified Aerial Phenomena (UFOs/UAP).

It was launched in 2021 by Harvard University astrophysicist, Avi Loeb, shortly after the ODNI UFO report (prepared by the U.S. Intelligence), which reported sightings of aircraft or other devices apparently flying at mysterious speeds or trajectories, and a 3 June 2021 speech by the head of NASA, Bill Nelson, in which he stated scientific analysis of Unidentified Aerial Phenomena detected by a multitude of instruments was needed. On 5 June, Loeb emailed NASA to suggest such a scientific project but received no reply upon which he launched the project on his own on 26 July 2021 with the help of donations.

The non-profit project is searching for extraterrestrial technological equipment, which can be considered to be technosignatures, including gathering new data about peculiar UFOs with dedicated optimized unclassified sensor systems.

== Overview ==
The project aims to use existing and new telescopes to systematically look for artifacts in Earth's orbit, interstellar objects, and unexplained craft, sometimes called "anomalous aerial vehicles" (AAV), in Earth's atmosphere. Research into UFOs, including ufology, has often been criticized for working with or providing only little or low-quality data, especially as adherence to the "extraordinary claims require extraordinary evidence" adage is a guiding principle of scientific inquiry. The project aims to address the data-quality issue by setting up new sensor systems. The project aims to make the collected data publicly available to scientific scrutiny and publish papers with "transparent" scientific analysis in peer-reviewed scientific journals. Loeb notes that "people in the military or in politics are not trained as scientists, and should not be asked to interpret what they see in the sky." The project uses an agnostic (or "secular" or "unbiased, empirical inquiry") approach by which no potential explanations – including those that are considered to be unlikely by some experts – are rejected a priori but data is gathered and scientifically investigated to, based on the results, develop any conclusions.

Its two other main avenues of research are searching for "two further types of potential extraterrestrial technological signatures with the use of AI": 'Oumuamua-like interstellar objects, and non-manmade artificial satellites.

Over 100 scientists worldwide are involved in the project.

In July 2023, astronomer Avi Loeb and his team reported the possibility of finding interstellar material. Claims made by Loeb and his team about their findings have been doubted by their peers according to a report in The New York Times.

== Activities ==
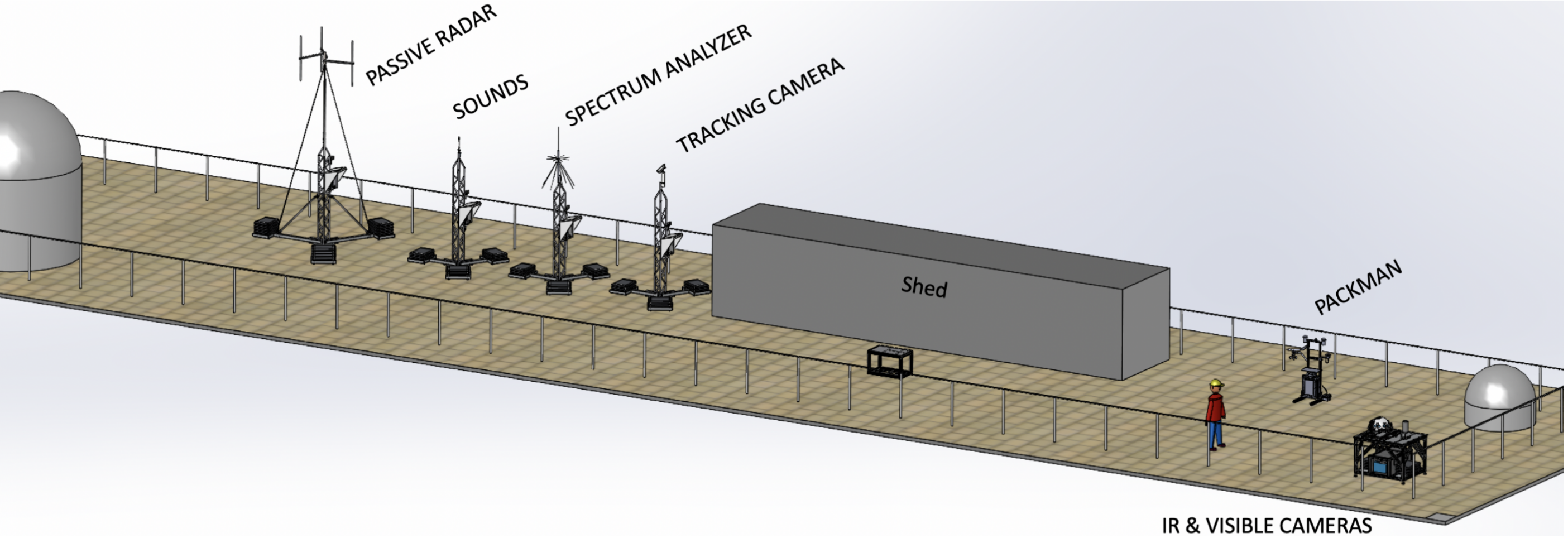
"Constructing new telescope systems to infer the nature of Unidentified Aerial Phenomena (UAP), similar to those mentioned in the ODNI report (ODNI 2021) to the US Congress"

Loeb has stated that at a minimum, the "Galileo Project will gather rich data sets that may foster the discovery of – or better scientific explanations for – novel interstellar objects with anomalous properties, and for potential new natural phenomena or terrestrial technology explanations for many presently inexplicable UAP".

=== Telescopes ===
One project aims to construct a series of optical and infrared telescopes to monitor the sky and use artificial intelligence to classify and analyse the observations. Its first telescope was installed on the roof of the Harvard College Observatory in 2022. More sensor systems are planned to be deployed worldwide, possibly in a networked way. In September 2022, it was reported that the project should begin collecting observations in January and Loeb has stated in an online post on 24 October that instruments designed by the Galileo Project are "by now collecting new high-quality data".

The telescope systems use machine learning to sort out, for example, "birds, balloons, drones, atmospheric events, aircraft and satellites from more mysterious sightings".

The telescopes could be supplemented by radar systems that would "distinguish a physical object in the sky from a weather pattern or a mirage". Moreover, like NASA for their UAP study, the project is looking into also using Earth observation satellites, in particular data collected by miniature satellites by Planet Labs.

Loeb has stated that so far SETI was mainly "predicated on the assumption that extraterrestrials communicate via radio waves, a technology we have used for just over a century and which advanced extraterrestrials may have long ago left behind", noting that a better strategy may be "to look for artefacts: alien tech". Astronomer Jason Wright affirms that "very little" of such searching is being done, but "artefact SETI" seems to "have got more traction lately". Artefacts may have been able to accumulate in the Solar System – like our "mailbox" – for 4.55 billion years.

A goal of the project is to capture "new crisp images with better instruments than have ever been used by civilians". While relevant sensors are not only photographic cameras, Loeb stated in early 2022 that high-resolution images could be collected within two years.

=== Study of interstellar objects like 'Oumuamua ===
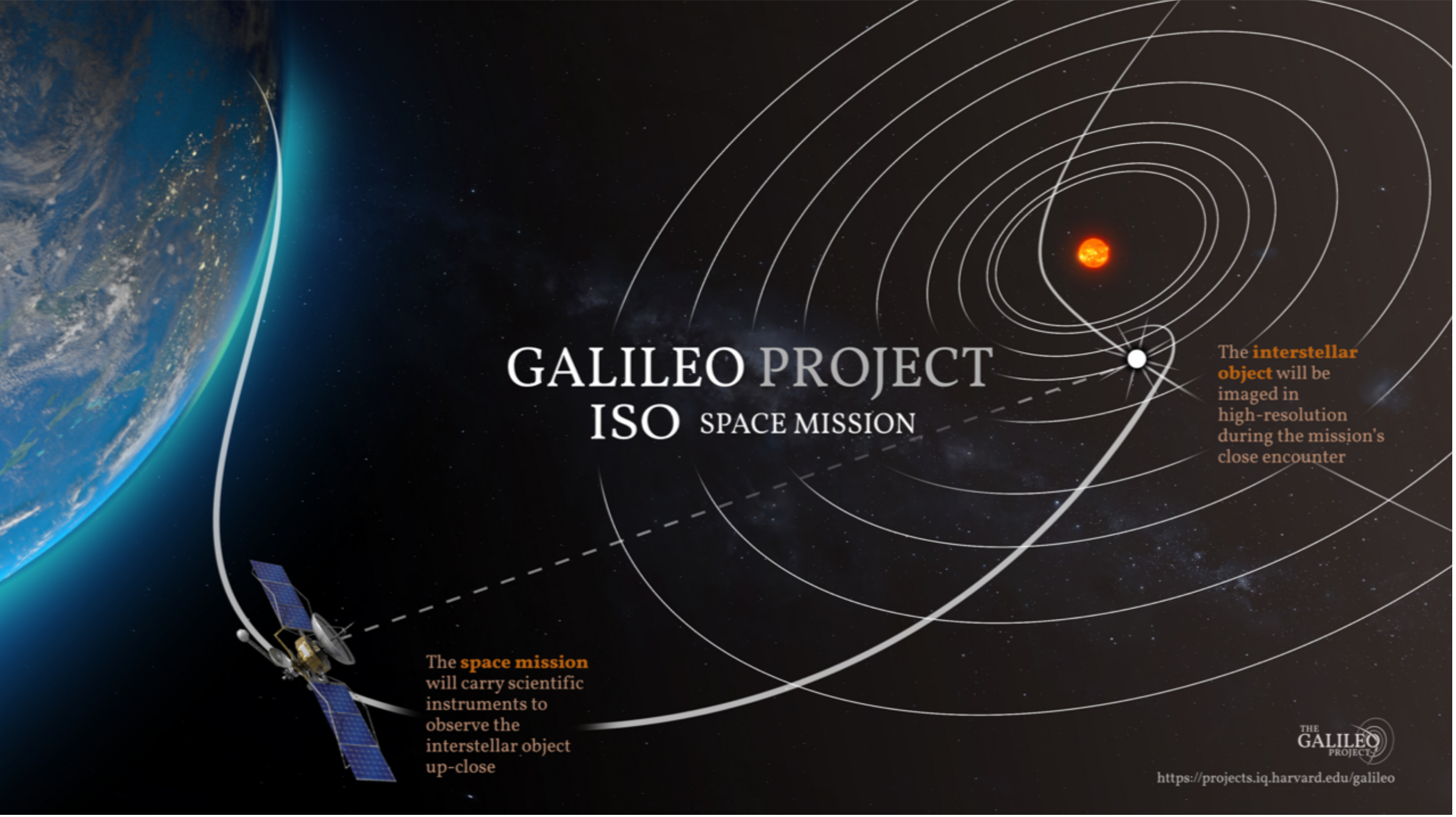
"Mining high-quality telescope data, e.g. from the Vera C. Rubin Observatory or from the Webb telescope to discover anomalous interstellar objects, and designing intercept or rendezvous space missions that that [sic] will identify the nature of interstellar objects that do not resemble comets or asteroids, like ‘Oumuamua"

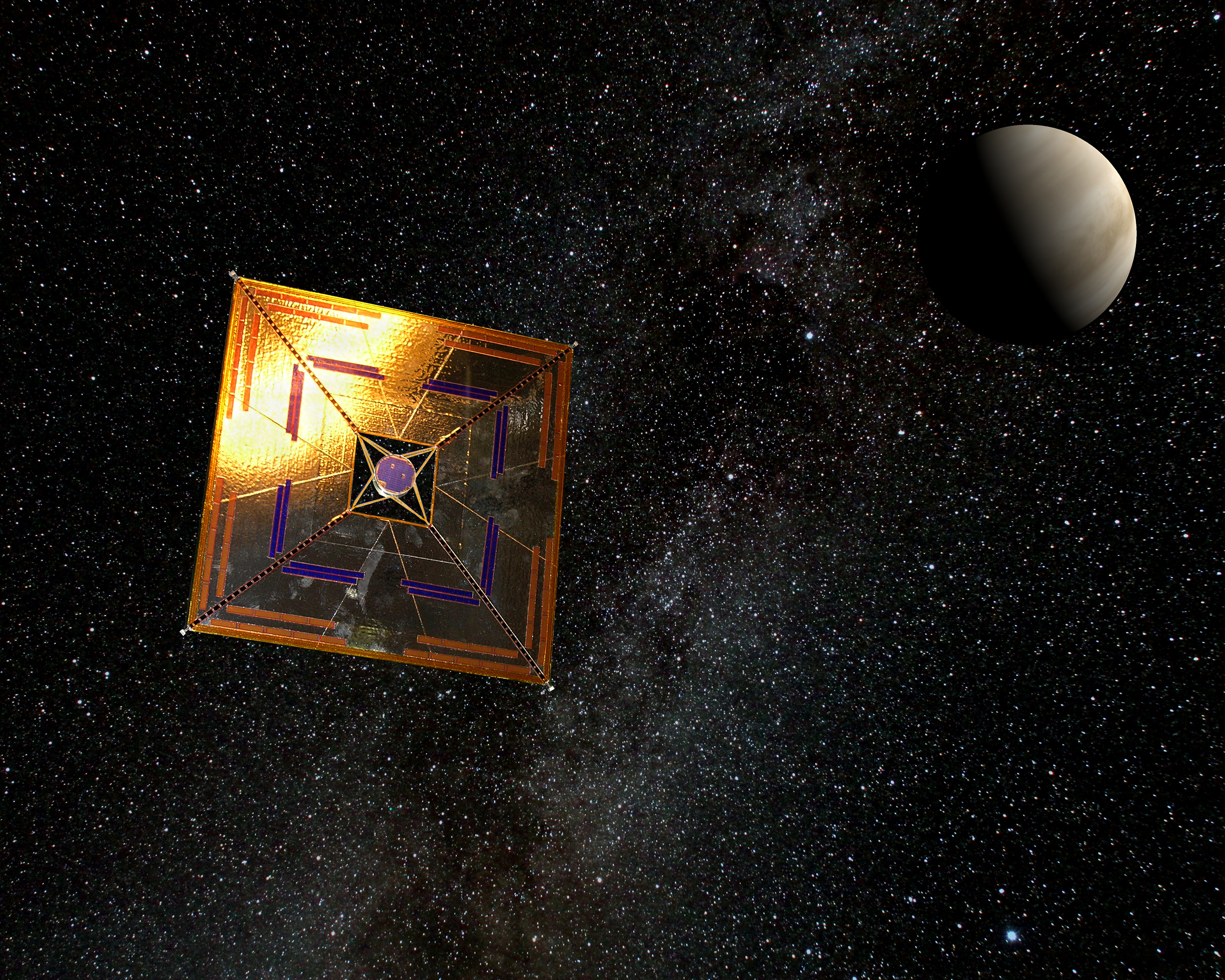
According to Loeb, observational data indicates 'Oumuamua could be a light sail; and solar sail technology could be a way to intercept such an object with a probe, as e.g. Project Lyra suggests.

The project plans to search for, characterize and study interstellar objects (ISOs) like the peculiar 'Oumuamua detected in 2017. They intend to use astronomical surveys like the Vera C. Rubin Observatory so that such objects can be identified more quickly, and to design a space mission so a probe could intercept it and gather close-up data. The team intends to develop software that "will analyze data collected from the Vera Rubin Observatory". It is thought that when the observatory commences its Legacy Survey of Space and Time (LSST), "it will be able to detect ISOs entering our Solar System at a rate of a few per month".

In collaboration with Alan Stern, principal investigator of NASA's New Horizons mission, they have received funding to develop such a space mission concept.

The project may trace its origins back to 2017 when its founder, Loeb, first got excited about the topic and gained substantial public attention after the first known interstellar object, ’Oumuamua, was discovered and displayed highly unusual properties and behavior. Loeb investigated and elaborated these anomalies and proposed that it could be a kind of extraterrestrial technology in scientific journals, many media appearances and a book, Extraterrestrial: The First Sign of Intelligent Life Beyond Earth.

The Interstellar Object Studies branch is led by Amir Siraj, a Harvard astrophysicist who frequently collaborates with Loeb and co-discoverer of one or two interstellar objects.

In 2022, Siraj and Loeb reported the discovery of an additional candidate interstellar meteor, CNEOS 2017-03-09, in a preprint using the same fireball catalog as they used for CNEOS 2014-01-08. They find that the implied material strength of the two objects (these are the highest and third-highest of the catalog's 273 fireballs) suggests that interstellar meteors "come from a population with material strength characteristically higher than meteors originating from within the solar system".

=== Deep-ocean expedition to recover CNEOS 2014-01-08 fragments ===
The project focused on the 2014 meteor CNEOS 2014-01-08, which Loeb and Siraj claimed was "rare both in composition and in speed", leading them to claim it was an interstellar object.

Loeb announced that private philanthropists were funding an expedition to search the floor in the suspected region of impact by dragging a magnetic sled on the seafloor off the coast of Papua New Guinea. In 2023 Loeb announced the discovery of an anomalous 8-millimeter-long curled piece of wire, designated "ISI-2". X-ray fluorescence analysis determined it was chiefly composed of Manganese and Platinum, commonly used in the manufacture of corrosion resistant laboratory electrodes. However, the relative composition of the elements in the wire was significantly different than that used in electrodes.

Additionally, metallic shards were discovered that were determined to be composed of a S5 steel alloy, which bears a yield strength that far exceeds that of iron meteorites, reflecting previously published results that characterized IM1's strength. Two varieties were found, dubbed "red" and "gray" which are representative of a differing oxidation state. Further fragments were found several kilometers away.

The scientific community remained skeptical of all the associated claims, from whether the meteor was interstellar, to whether it landed in that part of the ocean, to whether fragments could be recovered, to whether or not those specific objects found were of off earth origin. The seismic data on which Loeb partially based his estimate of the impact site was shown to be the result, not of an impact, but of nearby truck traffic.

=== Search for non-human artificial satellites ===
The project intends to systematically search for non-manmade artificial satellites (or semi-artificial satellites or artifacts on them) in Earth's orbit – for example by designing algorithms for telescopes to recognize and filter orbiting objects and using modern sky surveys.

An object in a geosynchronous orbit may have been there for many millions of years and both intact material, as well as debris from degraded probes, could be detected even if they have undergone multiple collisions during this period. As any "high-albedo objects are moving, spinning and emitting reflections from time to time", it should be possible to "confirm their existence through customized searches of modern data". The project can search for "these glinting events more effectively than was possible with other surveys".

== Members ==
The team includes scientists who as of 2021 work on a voluntary basis from Caltech, Cambridge University, Harvard, Princeton, Stockholm University, the University of Tokyo, and other institutions. The project also lists "Affiliated professionals who offer useful expertise and input to the Research Team", and members of a "Scientific Advisory Board" and a "Philanthropic Advisory Board".

== Funding ==
Its activities are funded by donations – $1.8 million as of 2021. The funders include Frank Laukien, CEO of Bruker Corporation and William A. Linton, founder of Promega Corporation, both listed on the project's Philanthropic Advisory Board. The donations are reported to be unconditional and philanthropic. Further funding that covers the costs of an expedition to retrieve fragments of an interstellar object was announced in September 2022.

Loeb has stated that around $100 million would be needed to fully realize its project of identifying the nature of UAP. Loeb has pointed out that research of dark matter is a still unsolved topic that he suggests to be "just as bizarre as aliens and far less relevant to daily human life" and that $100 million are only two percent of the Large Hadron Collider's "$5bn budget" and an even smaller fraction of Elon Musk's SpaceX project "valued at around $100bn". The creation of an interstellar object interceptor mission would be more expensive and was estimated to cost $1bn.

== Reception and impact ==
The project gained substantial mainstream media coverage, was applauded by many, including scientists, and gained traction on social media and in online communities of people interested in UFOs. An NBC News article describes the project as "exactly the kind of research many have called for after the release of the Pentagon's intelligence report in June [2021]".

There have also been various concerns, doubts and criticism about the prospects of the Galileo Project.

Some astronomers are worried that astronomy and the search for extraterrestrial intelligence (SETI) are getting undermined by projects like the Galileo Project. Senior astronomer for the SETI Institute, Seth Shostak has compared his organization's and broader UFO-unrelated SETI efforts with Loeb's project, describing his preferred approach as "studying unknown fauna in the rainforest", and the latter's search for aliens in Earth's atmosphere as "hoping to find mermaids or unicorns". However, Shostak also stated that Loeb's "peers" (i.e. the academic astronomical community) "should be grateful for [Loeb's] effort," and that he is "grateful that [Loeb] has the freedom—and the guts—to go where few would dare to go".

Some astronomers have also criticized claims by the project's lead scientist for "insufficient" evidence to "support his bold conjectures about alien life". Astrobiologist Caleb Scharf stated that the Galileo Project has "intermingled legitimate scientists with" what he assessed to be fringe people. Nonetheless, on 24 August 2023, The New York Times published an article about Loeb and his related search for signs of extraterrestrial life and The Galileo Project.

== See also ==
- Technosignature
- Fermi paradox
- Ufology#Research
- Search for extraterrestrial intelligence
