= CNEOS 2014-01-08 =

Purported interstellar meteor that hit Earth on 8 January 2014

- CNEOS 2014-01-08 (Pacific Ocean)
- Date: 8 January 2014; 12 years ago
- Time: 17:05:34 UT
- Location: near Papua New Guinea; 1.3°S 147.6°E

CNEOS 2014-01-08 was a 0.45 m (1.5 ft) meteor that impacted Earth on 8 January 2014 near the northeast coast of Papua New Guinea. It was claimed to be an interstellar object in a 2019 preprint by astronomers Amir Siraj and Avi Loeb, and this was published in 2022. This was supported by the U.S. Space Command in 2022 based on the object's velocity relative to the Sun. NASA and other astronomers doubt this, and still other experts found Earth-related explanations for the purported meteorite impact instead.

== Discovery and putative confirmation ==
According to the researchers, the meteor originated from an unbound hyperbolic orbit with a confidence of 99.999%. The interstellar candidate was found in data from the Center for Near-Earth Object Studies. The estimated speed of the meteor, around 60 km/s (37 mi/s), was likely produced in the innermost cores of another stellar system. A 2019 study by Jorge I. Zuluaga published as a research note by the American Astronomical Society concluded that even if the direction were completely unknown, the probability that CNEOS 2014-01-08 was hyperbolic would still be 48%.

Confirmation is stymied because information quantifying the accuracy of the U.S. government's data is not publicly available. In 2022, the United States Space Command divulged that data on the meteor's velocity is "sufficiently accurate to indicate an interstellar trajectory."

Further related studies were reported on 1 September 2023.

== Search for fragments ==
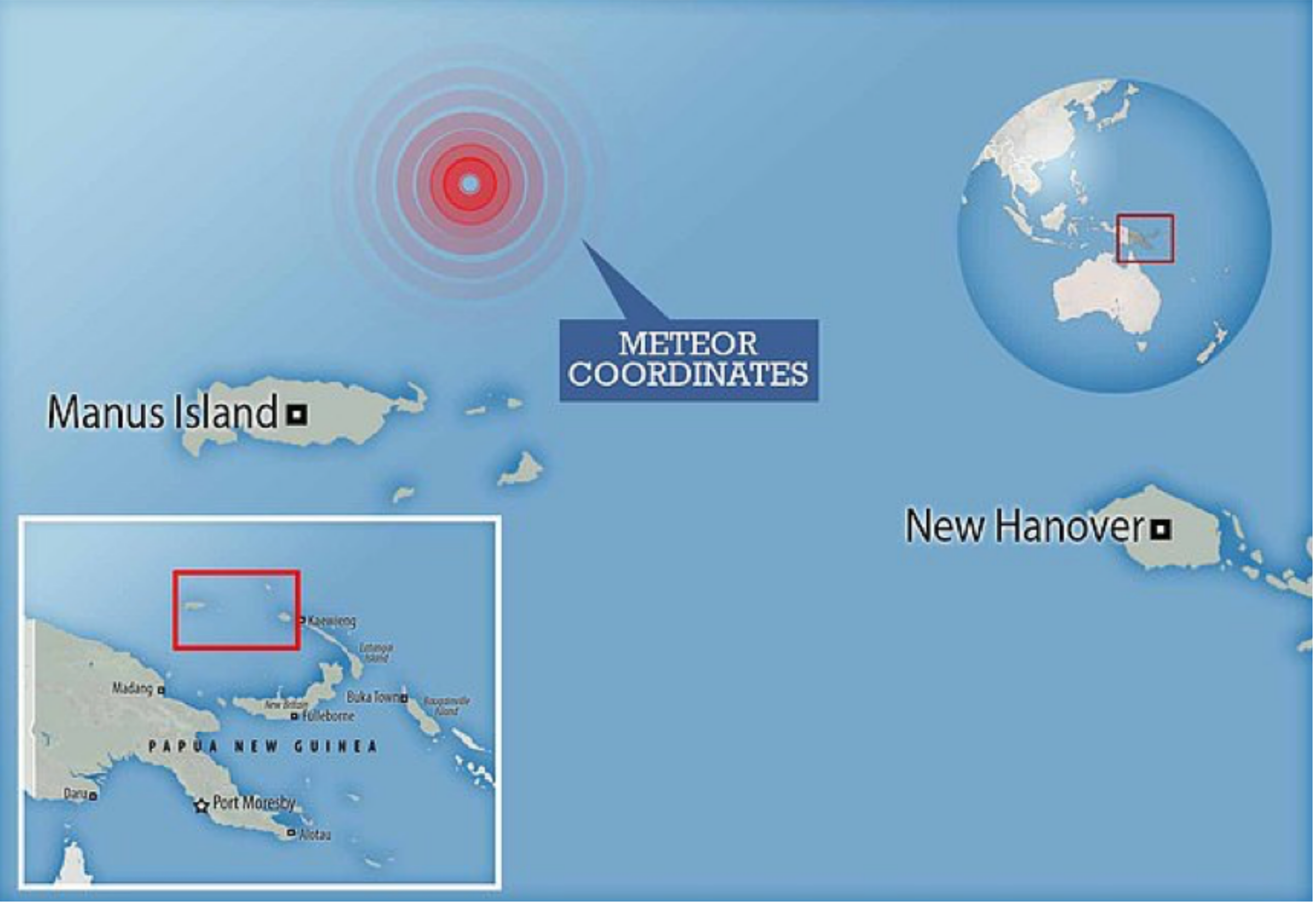
The Galileo Project intends to recover fragments of CNEOS 2014-01-08 from the seafloor off the coast of Papua New Guinea

Amir Siraj, one of the authors who reported the finding of the purported interstellar meteorite, noted, "We are currently investigating whether a mission to the bottom of the Pacific Ocean off the coast of Manus Island in the hopes of finding fragments of the 2014 meteor could be fruitful or even possible." Later, in a preprint (as well as in interviews), the authors described a planned expedition by The Galileo Project to retrieve small fragments of the meteor by deploying a magnetic sled on the seafloor of the impact region using a long-line winch, as the object—according to Loeb—"appears to be rare both in composition and in speed", and a possible identity with "extraterrestrial equipment" cannot be ruled out. Siraj noted that "[t]he alternative way to study an interstellar object at close range is by launching a space mission to a future object passing through the Earth's neighborhood"—a feat thought to be much more expensive than the project's planned budget of $1.6 million. In the study, the astronomers write:

Interestingly, CNEOS 2014-01-08, with a ram pressure of 194 MPa at peak brightness, has the highest material strength of all 273 bolides. The second highest tensile strength is smaller by more than a factor of 2, namely 81 MPa for the 2017-12-15 13:14:37 bolide. The third highest tensile strength, 75 MPa, belongs to the 2017-03-09 04:16:37 bolide, which we identified as a possible interstellar meteor candidate (Siraj & Loeb 2019c). Of course, this result does not imply that the first interstellar meteor was artificially made by a technological civilization and not natural in origin (Loeb 2021). Iron meteorites make about a twentieth of all space rocks arriving on Earth.

In a September 2022 blog post, Loeb announced that the Galileo Project expedition to search for fragments had been fully funded.

In November 2022, a paper was published claiming that the purportedly anomalous properties (such as high tensile strength and strongly hyperbolic trajectory) possessed by CNEOS-2014-01-08 are better described as measurement error, rather than as genuine parameters. If this is correct, successful retrieval of any meteoroid fragments is highly unlikely.

In July 2023, Amir Siraj and Avi Loeb reported finding metallic fragments that they believed to be from CNEOS 2014-01-08, the isotopic ratios of which indicated an age greater than that of the Solar System. Other astronomers have doubted that the meteor was interstellar, and criticized Siraj's and Loeb's method for determining where the meteor might have landed on Earth—claiming, e.g., that the seismic data used by the two astrophysicists had resulted not from an impact, but merely from nearby truck traffic.

== See also ==
- 1I/ʻOumuamua
- 2I/Borisov
- 3I/ATLAS
