= Chromium–vanadium steel =

Steel alloy variety

Chromium–vanadium steel (symbol Cr-V or CrV; 6000-series SAE steel grades, often marketed as "Boss AA") is a group of steel alloys incorporating carbon (0.50%), manganese (0.70–0.90%), silicon (0.30%), chromium (0.80–1.10%), and vanadium (0.18%). Some forms can be used as high-speed steel. Chromium and vanadium both make the steel more suitable for hardening. Chromium also helps resist abrasion, oxidation, and corrosion. Chromium and carbon can both improve elasticity.

== Compositional Effects ==
=== Chromium ===
Chromium acts as a carbide former within the primarily iron matrix. Initially carbides form utilizing nearest neighbor atoms, and so statistically show preference for iron in the M_{2}C form, where in steels M generally is Cr,Mo,V,W. These are elements who form semi-coherent HCP carbides within the matrix. During tempering these carbides decrease in iron content and increase in the other carbide formers. These carbides further reduce the carbon in the matrix during tempering and improve oxidation and corrosion resistance. A significant increase in peak strength is achieved compared to plain steels due to the carbides being semi-coherent and thus acting somewhere in between precipitate shearing, and orowan looping. This results in Precipitation hardening that has acts within three methods: Coherency hardening, Modulus hardening, and Non-deforming particles. Additionally, the size of M_{2}C carbides is smaller than their cementite counterparts in plain steels. This results in smaller precipitates which act as smaller flaws within the matrix leading to failure. The flaws in a material leading to failure is based upon Fracture mechanics,

$$a = \frac{1}{\pi} \left(\frac{\kappa_{Ic}}{\sigma_y}\right)^2$$

where a is the critical flaw or crack in the material, Κ_{Ic} is the fracture toughness of the material and σ_{y} is the yield strength of the material.

=== Vanadium ===
Vanadium forms carbides along with chromium. It additionally forms MC's at higher temperatures, where M generally is V, and Nb. These MC carbides can act as grain pinners according to Zener pinning. In ultra-high strength steels, this is utilized to provide a smaller grain size via recrystalization that is then pinned via these MC precipitates at high temperatures. Strengthening for this mechanism follows the Hall-Petch equation

$$\sigma_\text{y} = \sigma_0 + {k_\text{y} \over \sqrt {d}}$$

where σ_{0} is the matrix strength with large grains, k_{y} being an alloy specific constant (called the Hall-Petch Slope), and d being the grain diameter. Significant strengthening is usually seen around the 10μm length. the required precipitate fraction and size to functionally pin the grains utilizing Zener pinning depends on your time at high temperatures, and what temperature you are using usually for solutionizing or austenitizing, however it is generally seen as a linear correlation between particle size and required phase fraction to pin the grains, down to about the single nanometers. Residual nitrogen in the system from air melting practices can make even more stable vanadium carbo-nitrides, which can support higher temperature stability. Utilizing this mechanism with Zener pinning after working the material allows for a finer grain structure than as-cast which is one of very few methods to reduce grain size after solidification

== See also ==
- SVCM
