= Project Lyra =

Study of missions to interstellar objects

Project Lyra's Logo

Project Lyra is a feasibility study of a mission to interstellar objects such as ʻOumuamua and 2I/Borisov, initiated on 30 October 2017 by the Initiative for Interstellar Studies (i4is). In January 2022, researchers proposed that a spacecraft launched from Earth could catch up to ʻOumuamua in 26 years for further close-up studies.

== Overview ==
Options suggested by i4is initially (which have now been superseded) for sending a spacecraft to ʻOumuamua within a time-frame of 5 to 10 years were based on a launch in 2021, and required travelling first to Jupiter to conduct a flyby, followed by a close solar flyby at 3 to 10 solar radii, in order to take advantage of the Oberth effect. Subsequent research revealed further launch possibilities, notably in 2030 or 2033, using the same scenario (except the 2030 launch has an additional v-infinity Leveraging Maneuver), but with a total flight duration of 22 years. Thus, there are still future opportunities for a mission to ʻOumuamua.

Furthermore, alternative trajectory options were also explored by i4is, all of which utilized the much less technically challenging Jupiter Oberth rather than the previously assumed Solar Oberth. Launch years for these range between 2026 and 2033, depending on the chosen combination of gravity assists leading up to the Jupiter encounter.

Alternatively i4is proposed more advanced options such as a solar sail, laser sail, or nuclear propulsion.

Research as part of the project studies the use of the Starship, which could successfully send payload to ‘Oumuamua in 20 years, but it would require refuelling in LEO.

== Solar Oberth ==
ʻOumuamua was at first thought to be traveling too fast for any existing spacecraft to reach.

The Initiative for Interstellar Studies (i4is) launched Project Lyra to assess the feasibility of a mission to ʻOumuamua. Several options for sending a spacecraft to ʻOumuamua within a time-frame of 5 to 25 years were suggested.

The challenge highlighted by i4is is to get to the celestial object in a reasonable amount of time (and so at a reasonable distance from Earth), and yet be able to gain useful scientific information. To do this, decelerating the spacecraft at ʻOumuamua would be "highly desirable, due to the minimal science return from a hyper-velocity encounter". If the investigative craft goes too fast, it would not be able to get into orbit or land on the asteroid, and would fly past it. The authors conclude that, although challenging, an encounter mission would be feasible using near-term technology. Seligman and Laughlin adopt a complementary approach to the Lyra study, but also conclude that such missions, though challenging to mount, are both feasible and scientifically attractive.

One option suggested by i4is is using first a Jupiter flyby, followed by a close solar flyby at 3 solar radii (2.1×10^{6} km; 1.3×10^{6} mi), in order to take advantage of the Oberth effect. Subsequent proposals have relaxed the distance to up to 10 solar radii (7.0×10^{6} km; 4.3×10^{6} mi).

Initial research conducted by i4is indicated that a spacecraft with a mass of tens of kilograms, using a heat shield like that in the Parker Solar Probe, atop a Falcon Heavy-class launcher, with a trajectory including a powered Jupiter flyby and a Solar Oberth maneuver, was capable of reaching ʻOumuamua, had it been launched in 2021.

However, subsequent investigations revealed further opportunities for missions to ʻOumuamua will be possible, using a Solar Oberth at 6 solar radii (4.2×10^{6} km; 2.6×10^{6} mi), the soonest being in 2030/2033 – the choice of year depending on whether the trajectory exploits a 3-year leveraging maneuver or not. These involve flight durations in excess of 20 years which, although admittedly protracted, should be placed in the context of the Voyager probes, which launched over 45 years ago and are still to some extent operational today.

== Jupiter Oberth ==
Further investigations conducted by the i4is Project Lyra team revealed that viable missions to ʻOumuamua exist in the future, with launch for example in 2028, and do not necessarily require a Solar Oberth, exploiting instead a powered flyby of Jupiter, alternatively known as a Jupiter Oberth.

== Other options ==
More advanced options such as solar, laser electric propulsion, laser sail propulsion based on Breakthrough Starshot technology, and nuclear propulsion have also been considered.
