= Amir Siraj =

American astrophysicist

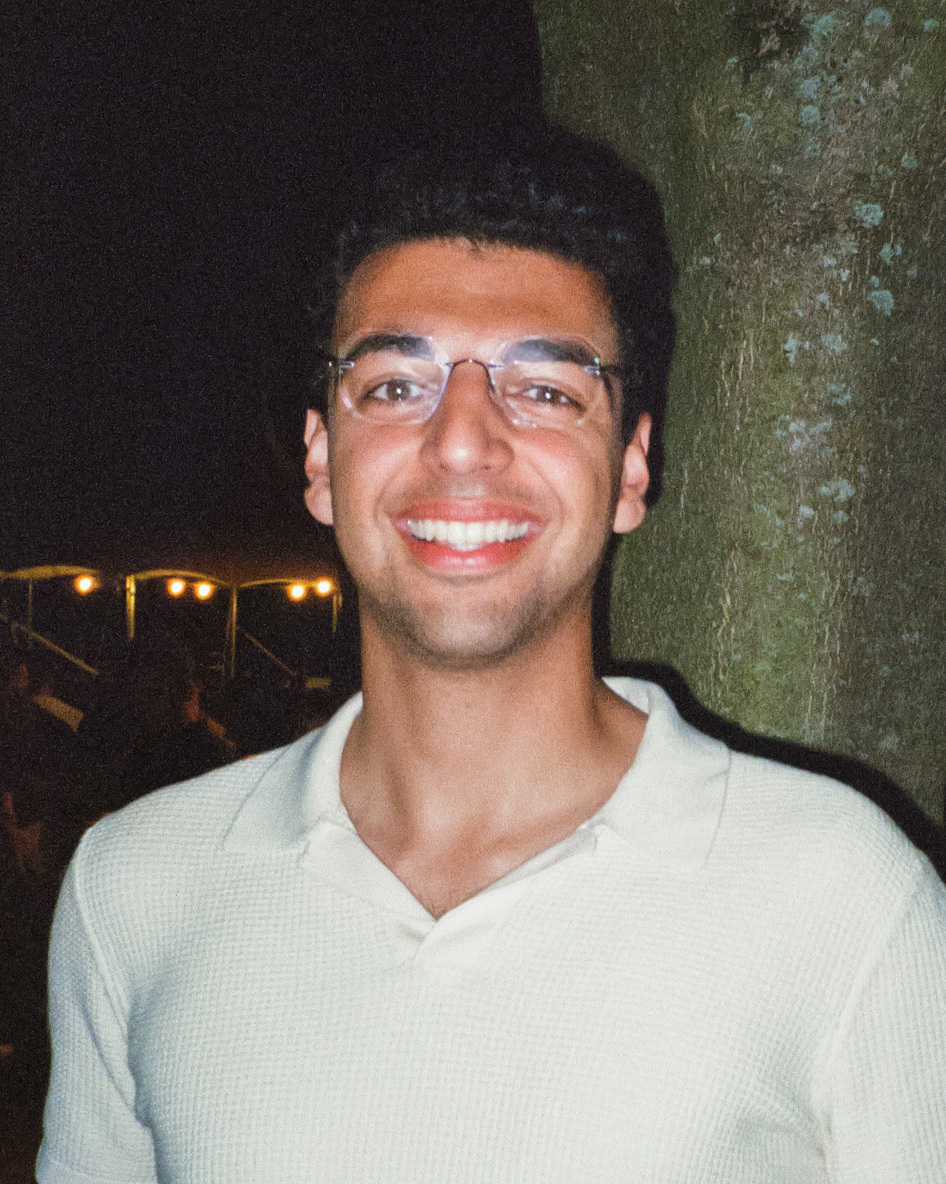
- Siraj in 2026
- Born: 2000 (age 25–26); USA
- Education: AB, Harvard University, 2022 AM, Harvard University, 2022; MM, New England Conservatory of Music, 2023 MA, Princeton University, 2024
- Alma mater: Harvard University, New England Conservatory of Music, Princeton University
- Occupations: Astrophysicist, Pianist
- Known for: Interstellar objects
- Parents: Ra'ad Siraj (father); Aban Makarechian (mother)
- Relatives: Yasmin Siraj (sister)
- Awards: Forbes 30 Under 30
- Scientific career
- Fields: Astrophysics, Music
- Website: https://siraj.scholar.princeton.edu/

Amir Siraj (born in 2000) is an American astrophysicist, pianist, and science and music communicator.

== Career ==
=== Astrophysics ===
Siraj earned bachelor's and master's degrees at Harvard University, and is currently pursuing his PhD at Princeton University.

His research is primarily focused on interstellar objects, asteroids and comets, planetary system formation and evolution, supernovae, black holes, dark matter, and the search for life in the universe. Recently, he proposed the existence of unseen captured planets in the outer Solar System. He co-discovered CNEOS 2014-01-08, a potentially interstellar meteor. Siraj is also known as the former director of interstellar object studies at the Galileo project, through which he was involved with the search and discovery mission for interstellar objects. His research was named one of CNN's extraordinary cosmic revelations and moments in space exploration in 2022. He was the youngest scientist named to the Forbes 30 Under 30 list in 2021, and Astronomy magazine named him a rising star in astronomy in 2022. He also contributes to Scientific American.

=== Music ===
An active concert pianist, Siraj is a Young Steinway Artist and US Presidential Scholar in the Arts. He graduated from the New England Conservatory of Music with a master's degree in 2023. He has performed with Yo-Yo Ma at UNESCO and the United Nations General Assembly. He played at the Atlantic Council's Global Citizen Awards for Justin Trudeau, as well as at the GRAMMY Salute to Classical Music at Carnegie Hall, at The Cliburn and at the opening concert for the Swiss Alps Classics.

At the Aspen Center for Physics, he moderated a panel discussion that brought top composers and physicists together in conversation. In partnership with the National Park Foundation and From the Top, he established Music For The Parks.
