= Orders of magnitude (probability) =

Comparison of a wide range of probabilities

This page lists events in order of increasing probability, grouped by orders of magnitude. These probabilities were calculated given assumptions detailed in the relevant articles and references. For example, the probabilities of obtaining the different poker hands assume that the cards are dealt fairly.

List of orders of magnitude for probability
| Factor | Value | Item |
|---|---|---|
| 10^{−∞} | 0 | Never |
| 10^{−n} | 10^{−n} | Probability of rolling a '1' n times in a row on a fair ten-sided die (any specific length-n sequence of rolls has the same probability) |
| 10^{−4.5×10^{29}} | ≈10^{−4.5×10^{29}} | Probability of a human spontaneously teleporting 50 kilometres (31 miles) in 1 second due to quantum effects |
| 10^{−1.81×10^{26}} | ≈10^{−1.81×10^{26}} | Probability of a small room containing 1,000 moles of air (about 22.4 cubic metres (790 cu ft)) spontaneously evacuating to one half |
| 10^{−360,783} | ≈10^{−360,783} | Probability of a monkey in front of a typewriter typing Hamlet on the first try, taking punctuation, capitalization and spacing into account |
| 10^{−183,800} | ≈10^{−183,800} | Rough first estimate of the probability of a monkey in front of a typewriter typing all the letters of Hamlet on the first try |
| 10^{−68} | 1.24×10^{−68} | Probability of shuffling a standard 52-card deck in any specific order |
| 10^{−28} | 4.47×10^{−28} | Approximate probability of all four players in a game of bridge getting a complete suit |
| 10^{−19} | 2.83×10^{−19} | Approximate probability of matching 20 numbers for 20 in a game of keno |
| 10^{−16} | 2.74×10^{−16} | Probability of rolling snake eyes 10 times in a row on a pair of fair dice |
| 10^{−11} | 2.52×10^{−11} | Approximate probability of one player in a game of bridge getting a complete suit |
| 10^{−10} | 2.0×10^{−10} | Probability per second of a SATA harddisk failure during an MTBF test |
| 10^{−10} | 5.25×10^{−10} | Caesium-137 atom decay each second |
| 10^{−10} | 9.9×10^{−10} | Gaussian distribution: probability of a value being more than 6 standard deviations from the mean on a specific side |
| 10^{−9} | 3.9×10^{−9} | Probability of an entry winning the jackpot in the Mega Millions multi-state lottery in the United States* |
| 10^{−9} | 5.707×10^{−9} | Probability of winning the Grand Prize (matching all 6 numbers) in the US Powerball lottery with one ticket in January 2014 |
| 10^{−8} | 1.303×10^{−8} | Probability of winning the Grand Prize (matching all 6 numbers) in the Australian Powerball lottery with one ticket in March 2013 |
| 10^{−8} | 2.219×10^{−8} | odds of winning the Jackpot (matching the 6 main numbers from 59) in the UK National Lottery with one ticket since 10 October 2015 |
| 10^{−8} | 7.151×10^{−8} | odds of winning the Jackpot (matching the 6 main numbers from 49) in the UK National Lottery with one ticket until 10 October 2015 |
| 10^{−7} | 1.17×10^{−7} | Death per aircraft journey |
| 10^{−7} | 2.9×10^{−7} | Gaussian distribution: probability of a value being more than 5 standard deviations from the mean on a specific side |
| 10^{−7} | 8.0×10^{−7} | Death per person per year by lightning strike in Germany (Europe) |
| 10^{−6} | 1×10^{−6} | Life-threatening adverse reaction from a measles vaccine |
| 10^{−6} | 1.4×10^{−6} | Annual probability of a caldera-forming eruption by the Yellowstone supervolcano, purely based on the timing of the last three such eruptions. Geological models assign a probability under 1×10^{−6}. |
| 10^{−6} | 1.5×10^{−6} | Probability of being dealt a royal flush in poker |
| 10^{−5} | 1.4×10^{−5} | Probability of being dealt a straight flush (other than a royal flush) in poker |
| 10^{−5} | 3.2×10^{−5} | Gaussian distribution: probability of a value being more than 4 standard deviations from the mean on a specific side |
| 10^{−5} | 8.43×10^{−5} | Probability of a deadly vehicle accident per person in Europe each year (not including former Yugoslavia) |
| 10^{−4} | 2.4×10^{−4} | Probability of being dealt a four of a kind in poker |
| 10^{−4} | 7.1×10^{−4} | Probability of a human birth giving triplets or higher-order multiples in the U.S. in 2024 |
| 10^{−3} | 1.3×10^{−3} | Gaussian distribution: probability of a value being more than 3 standard deviations from the mean on a specific side |
| 10^{−3} | 1.4×10^{−3} | Probability of being dealt a full house in poker |
| 10^{−3} | 1.9×10^{−3} | Probability of being dealt a flush in poker |
| 10^{−3} | 2.7×10^{−3} | Probability of a random day of the year being your birthday (for all birthdays besides Feb 29) |
| 10^{−3} | 4×10^{−3} | Probability of being dealt a straight in poker |
| 10^{−2} | 1.8×10^{−2} | Probability of winning any prize in the UK National Lottery with one ticket in 2003 |
| 10^{−2} | 2.1×10^{−2} | Probability of being dealt a three of a kind in poker |
| 10^{−2} | 2.3×10^{−2} | Gaussian distribution: probability of a value being more than 2 standard deviations from the mean on a specific side |
| 10^{−2} | 2.7×10^{−2} | Probability of winning any prize in the Powerball with one ticket in 2006 |
| 10^{−2} | 3.3×10^{−2} | Probability of a human giving birth to twins |
| 10^{−2} | 4.8×10^{−2} | Probability of being dealt a two pair in poker |
| 10^{−1} | 1.6×10^{−1} | Gaussian distribution: probability of a value being more than 1 standard deviation from the mean on a specific side |
| 10^{−1} | 1.7×10^{−1} | Chance of rolling a '6' on a fair six-sided die |
| 10^{−1} | 4.2×10^{−1} | Probability of being dealt only one pair in poker |
| 10^{−1} | 5.0×10^{−1} | Chance of getting a 'head' in a coin toss. Physically less than 0.5; approximately 4.9983×10^{−1} for US nickel accounting for 1.67×10^{−4} (1-in-6000 chance) of coin landing on its edge. |
| 10^{−1} | 5.0×10^{−1} | Probability of being dealt no pair in poker |
| 10^{0} | 1 | Certain |
