= List of bolides in 2017 =

The following is a list of bolides and fireballs seen on Earth in 2017. These are small asteroids (known as meteoroids) that regularly impact the Earth. Although most are so small that they burn up in the atmosphere before reaching the surface, some larger objects may reach the surface as fragments, known as meteorites.

Meteors with a recorded absolute magnitude are then converted to an asteroidal absolute magnitude under (M_{a} = M_{m} + 31) and then converted to a diameter assuming that meteoroids brighten by approximate 10 magnitudes when entering the atmosphere. Objects reported only to the American Meteor Society are only listed if observed by at least 10 people, and are cross-referenced with https://fireballs.ndc.nasa.gov if possible, to determine further physical characteristics. The fourth and third to last parameters are calculated from http://convertalot.com/asteroid_impact_calculator.html, assuming a density of 1.5 g/cm^{3}, an impact angle of 45°, and a velocity of 17 km/s (if not provided). The actual values for both may vary by as much as the value itself, so be aware that these values are only estimates.

== List ==
number of bolides with ≥10 reports reported to the AMS
	Bolides
January	22
February	21
March	29
April	19
May	15
June	12
July	20
August	17
September	26
October	37
November	49
December	34

number of bolides with ≥100 reports reported to the AMS
	Bolides
January	2
February	2
March	2
April	3
May	0
June	0
July	1
August	2
September	3
October	2
November	7
December	5

number of different bolides reported to the AMS
	Bolides
January	417
February	433
March	370
April	332
May	256
June	326
July	382
August	507
September	467
October	581
November	687
December	691

number of bolides reported by CNEOS
	Bolides
January	0
February	5
March	3
April	1
May	3
June	3
July	3
August	0
September	1
October	5
November	1
December	4

=== December ===
Date/time	Local time	Continent	Country	Location	Altitude (km)	Velocity (km/s)	Velocityx (km/s)	Velocityy (km/s)	Velocityz (km/s)	Energy (Gj)	impact energy (kt)	primary size (m)	impact size (m)	AMS reports	AMS event (if applicable)
2017/12/31 17:35	17:35	Europe	United Kingdom	United Kingdom/England	?	?	?	?	?	?	?	?	?	930	5538-2017
2017/12/31 09:36:10	02:36:10	Antarctica	NA	Southern Ocean/South America	?	?	?	?	?	?	?	?	?	0	
2017/12/31 02:56	18:56	North America	United States	United States/Washington	?	?	?	?	?	?	?	?	?	35	5531-2017
2017/12/30 23:25	18:25	North America	United States	United States/Michigan-Illinois border	?	?	?	?	?	?	?	?	?	24	5520-2017
2017/12/29 22:21	17:21	North America	United States	United States/Pennsylvania	?	?	?	?	?	?	?	?	?	21	5512-2017
2017/12/29 12:47:31	09:47:31	South America	NA	Atlantic Ocean/Central west	38.0	?	?	?	?	110	0.33	2.30	23.0	0	
2017/12/29 03:44	22:44	North America	United States	United States/New Hampshire	?	?	?	?	?	?	?	?	?	21	5508-2017
2017/12/28 20:57	21:52	Europe	France	France/Île-de-France	?	?	?	?	?	?	?	?	?	11	5502-2017
2017/12/28 17:45:44	?	?	?	?	?	?	?	?	?	114	0.34	2.33	23.2	?	
2017/12/26 22:52	17:52	North America	United States	United States/New Hampshire	?	?	?	?	?	?	?	?	?	365	5450-2017
2017/12/25 01:15	17:15	North America	United States	United States/California	?	?	?	?	?	?	?	?	?	153	5361-2017
2017/12/25 00:26	18:26	North America	Canada	Canada/Manitoba	?	?	?	?	?	?	?	?	?	15	5429-2017
2017/12/24 02:36	21:36	North America	United States	United States/Florida	?	?	?	?	?	?	?	?	?	22	5360-2017
2017/12/20 21:28	17:28	North America	Canada	Canada/Nova Scotia	?	?	?	?	?	?	?	?	?	23	5334-2017
2017/12/19 22:19	17:19	North America	United States	United States/Connecticut	?	?	?	?	?	?	?	?	?	20	5332-2017
2017/12/19 05:51	23:51	North America	United States	United States/Wisconsin coast	?	?	?	?	?	?	?	?	?	74	5311-2017
2017/12/19 02:27	21:27	North America	United States	United States/Tennessee	?	?	?	?	?	?	?	?	?	12	5325-2017
2017/12/15 13:14:37	01:14:37	Asia	Russia	Russia/Kamchatka	20.0	31.4	27.8	-4.7	-13.9	3114	6.4	4.11	56.0	0	
2017/12/15 03:18	21:18	North America	United States	United States/Illinois	?	?	?	?	?	?	?	?	?	10	5114-2017
2017/12/15 02:51	19:51	North America	United States	United States/Colorado	?	?	?	?	?	?	?	?	?	70	5113-2017
2017/12/15 02:02	20:02	North America	United States	United States/Texas	?	?	?	?	?	?	?	?	?	12	5115-2017
2017/12/14 17:39	18:39	Europe	France	France/Nouvelle-Aquitaine	?	?	?	?	?	?	?	?	?	58	5117-2017
2017/12/14 17:34	18:34	Europe	France	France/Pays de la Loire	?	?	?	?	?	?	?	?	?	21	5119-2017
2017/12/13 02:53	21:53	North America	United States	United States/Pennsylvania	?	?	?	?	?	?	?	?	?	10	5159-2017
2017/12/12 21:31	22:31	Europe	France	France/Bourgogne-Franche-Comté	?	?	?	?	?	?	?	?	?	13	5163-2017
2017/12/10 04:01	22:01	North America	United States	United States/Missouri	?	?	?	?	?	?	?	?	?	21	5013-2017
2017/12/10 03:32	21:32	North America	United States	United States/Kansas	?	?	?	?	?	?	?	?	?	24	5011-2017
2017/12/09 03:07	20:07	North America	United States	United States/Arizona	?	?	?	?	?	?	?	?	?	18	4937-2017
2017/12/08 23:49	17:49	North America	United States	United States/Missouri	?	?	?	?	?	?	?	?	?	32	4940-2017
2017/12/08 05:41	00:41	North America	United States	United States/New York	?	?	?	?	?	?	?	?	?	26	4925-2017
2017/12/07 11:58	05:58	North America	United States	United States/Kansas	?	?	?	?	?	?	?	?	?	13	4929-2017
2017/12/06 00:19	18:19	North America	United States	United States/Kansas	?	?	?	?	?	?	?	?	?	21	4924-2017
2017/12/05 23:35	18:35	North America	United States	United States/Florida coast	?	?	?	?	?	?	?	?	?	185	4894-2017
2017/12/04 16:03	06:03	North America	United States	United States/Hawaii coast	?	?	?	?	?	?	?	?	?	11	4891-2017
2017/12/03 06:22	00:22	North America	United States	United States/Iowa	?	?	?	?	?	?	?	?	?	29	4869-2017
2017/12/02 08:10	03:10	North America	United States	United States/Pennsylvania	?	?	?	?	?	?	?	?	?	152	4827-2017
2017/12/02 01:57	20:57	North America	United States	United States/Ohio	?	?	?	?	?	?	?	?	?	25	4829-2017
2017/12/01 00:14	19:14	North America	United States	United States/Michigan	?	?	?	?	?	?	?	?	?	16	4824-2017

=== November ===
Date/time	Local time	Continent	Country	Location	Altitude (km)	Velocity (km/s)	Velocityx (km/s)	Velocityy (km/s)	Velocityz (km/s)	Energy (Gj)	impact energy (kt)	primary size (m)	impact size (m)	AMS reports	AMS event (if applicable)
2017/11/29 17:06	17:06	Europe	United Kingdom	United Kingdom/England	?	?	?	?	?	?	?	?	?	83	4781-2017
2017/11/29 01:40	20:40	North America	United States	United States/Michigan coast	?	?	?	?	?	?	?	?	?	16; 15	4772-2017; 4773-2017
2017/11/28 22:40	17:40	North America	United States	United States/New York	?	?	?	?	?	?	?	?	?	11	4767-2017
2017/11/28 06:14	07:14	Europe	France	France/Île-de-France	?	?	?	?	?	?	?	?	?	36	4776-2017
2017/11/27 18:05	19:05	Europe	France	France/Occitanie coast	?	?	?	?	?	?	?	?	?	11	4715-2017
2017/11/26 05:58	23:58	North America	United States	United States/Texas	?	?	?	?	?	?	?	?	?	46	4667-2017
2017/11/26 03:16	21:16	North America	United States	United States/Missouri	?	?	?	?	?	?	?	?	?	47	4668-2017
2017/11/25 20:32	21:32	Europe	France	France/Auvergne-Rhône-Alpes	?	?	?	?	?	?	?	?	?	59	4664-2017
2017/11/25 07:12	07:12	Europe	United Kingdom	United Kingdom/England	?	?	?	?	?	?	?	?	?	232	4588-2017
2017/11/25 05:40	22:40	North America	Canada	Canada/Saskatchewan	?	?	?	?	?	?	?	?	?	22	4589-2017
2017/11/25 00:01	00:01	Europe	United Kingdom	United Kingdom/England	?	?	?	?	?	?	?	?	?	113	4590-2017
2017/11/24 22:25	17:25	North America	United States	United States/Virginia coast	?	?	?	?	?	?	?	?	?	103	4582-2017
2017/11/23 10:43	05:43	North America	United States	United States/New York	?	?	?	?	?	?	?	?	?	14	4577-2017
2017/11/23 06:57	01:57	North America	United States	United States/Massachusetts	?	?	?	?	?	?	?	?	?	41	4572-2017
2017/11/23 03:09	21:09	North America	United States	United States/Texas	?	?	?	?	?	?	?	?	?	13	4574-2017
2017/11/22 23:56	17:56	North America	United States	United States/Texas coast	?	?	?	?	?	?	?	?	?	12	4578-2017
2017/11/19 20:10	21:10	Europe	France	France/Pays de la Loire	?	?	?	?	?	?	?	?	?	19	4514-2017
2017/11/19 11:02	06:02	North America	United States	United States/West Virginia	?	?	?	?	?	?	?	?	?	21	4499-2017
2017/11/19 04:17:32	13:47:32	Australia	Australia	Australia/Northern Territory	33.3	11.4	6.7	-3.4	8.6	28	0.098	2.00	15.9	102	4500-2017
2017/11/19 01:30	17:30	North America	United States	United States/California coast	?	?	?	?	?	?	?	?	?	102	4500-2017
2017/11/18 09:55	01:55	North America	United States	United States/California coast	?	?	?	?	?	?	?	?	?	12	4449-2017
2017/11/17 06:00	22:00	North America	United States	United States/California coast	?	?	?	?	?	?	?	?	?	10	4430-2017
2017/11/17 03:00	22:00	North America	United States	United States/New York coast	?	?	?	?	?	?	?	?	?	17	4430-2017
2017/11/16 22:46	22:46	Europe	NA	North sea	?	?	?	?	?	?	?	?	?	14	4432-2017
2017/11/15 22:44	23:44	Europe	Belgium	Belgium/Walloon Region	?	?	?	?	?	?	?	?	?	14	4384-2017
2017/11/15 19:11	20:11	Europe	France	France/Provence-Alpes-Côte d'Azur coast	?	?	?	?	?	?	?	?	?	14	4378-2017
2017/11/15 16:49	17:49	Europe	France	France/Grand Est	?	?	?	?	?	?	?	?	?	12	4376-2017
2017/11/15 03:29	20:29	North America	United States	United States/Arizona	?	?	?	?	?	?	?	?	?	155	4310-2017
2017/11/15 01:47	20:47	North America	United States	United States/Ohio	?	?	?	?	?	?	?	?	?	59	4311-2017
2017/11/14 21:31	22:31	Europe	France	France/Nouvelle-Aquitaine	?	?	?	?	?	?	?	?	?	92	4312-2017
2017/11/14 16:47	17:47	Europe	Germany	Germany/Hesse	?	10	?	?	?	?	?	?	?	2045; 1; 1; 4	4299-2017; 4309-2017; 4381-2017; 4382-2017
2017/11/13 21:19	19:19	South America	Brazil	Brazil/São Paulo	?	?	?	?	?	?	?	?	?	54	4268-2017
2017/11/13 05:29	21:29	North America	United States	United States/California	?	?	?	?	?	?	?	?	?	14	4267-2017
2017/11/12 19:37	20:37	Europe	France	France/Brittany	?	?	?	?	?	?	?	?	?	17	4266-2017
2017/11/12 04:00	21:00	North America	United States	United States/Utah	?	?	?	?	?	?	?	?	?	11	4252-2017
2017/11/11 18:00	19:00	Europe	Germany	Germany/Lower Saxony	?	?	?	?	?	?	?	?	?	12	4245-2017
2017/11/11 02:20	21:20	North America	United States	United States/New York	?	?	?	?	?	?	?	?	?	216	4235-2017
2017/11/10 04:38	21:38	North America	United States	United States/Arizona	48.1	15.0	?	?	?	?	?	01.50	?	51	4167-2017
2017/11/10 01:12	18:12	North America	United States	United States/New Mexico	?	?	?	?	?	?	?	?	?	11	4209-2017
2017/11/09 12:35	05:35	North America	United States	United States/Idaho	?	?	?	?	?	?	?	?	?	24	4162-2017
2017/11/08 23:12	18:12	North America	Canada	Canada/Quebec	?	?	?	?	?	?	?	?	?	19	4197-2017
2017/11/08 22:39	17:39	North America	Canada	Canada/Quebec border	?	?	?	?	?	?	?	?	?	30	4163-2017
2017/11/08 09:21	01:21	North America	United States	United States/Arizona	?	?	?	?	?	?	?	?	?	19	4157-2017
2017/11/07 22:56	22:56	Europe	United Kingdom	United Kingdom/England coast	?	?	?	?	?	?	?	?	?	10	4156-2017
2017/11/06 20:58	21:58	Europe	Germany	Germany/Saxony-Anhalt	?	?	?	?	?	?	?	?	?	27; 1	4145-2017; 4169-2017
2017/11/06 01:29	17:29	North America	United States	United States/California	?	?	?	?	?	?	?	?	?	26	4144-2017
2017/11/03 22:37	18:37	North America	United States	United States/New York	?	?	?	?	?	?	?	?	?	49	4111-2017
2017/11/03 20:10	21:10	Europe	Germany	Germany/Bavaria	?	?	?	?	?	?	?	?	?	22	4124-2017
2017/11/02 06:09	06:09	Europe	United Kingdom	United Kingdom/England	?	?	?	?	?	?	?	?	?	17	4105-2017

=== October ===
Date/time	Local time	Continent	Country	Location	Altitude (km)	Velocity (km/s)	Velocityx (km/s)	Velocityy (km/s)	Velocityz (km/s)	Energy (Gj)	impact energy (kt)	primary size (m)	impact size (m)	AMS reports	AMS event (if applicable)
2017/10/31 05:11	00:11	North America	United States	United States/Louisiana	?	?	?	?	?	?	?	?	?	16	4049-2017
2017/10/30 19:36	20:36	Europe	United Kingdom	United Kingdom/England	?	?	?	?	?	?	?	?	?	20	4048-2017
2017/10/30 18:39	18:39	Europe	France	France/Auvergne-Rhône-Alpes	?	?	?	?	?	?	?	?	?	173; 6	4047-2017; 4096-2017
2017/10/28 02:28	01:28	North America	United States	United States/Texas	?	?	?	?	?	?	?	?	?	12	4025-2017
2017/10/28 01:34	20:34	North America	United States	United States/Louisiana	?	?	?	?	?	?	?	?	?	11	4017-2017
2017/10/27 03:24	23:24	North America	United States	United States/North Carolina	?	?	?	?	?	?	?	?	?	25	3996-2017
2017/10/26 22:05:35	10:05:35	Australia	NA	Fiji/Fiji coast	42.5	?	?	?	?	558	1.4	3.73	35.5	0	
2017/10/26 02:36	19:36	North America	United States	United States/Oregon	?	?	?	?	?	?	?	?	?	18	3994-2017
2017/10/26 01:20	21:20	North America	United States	United States/Florida coast	?	?	?	?	?	?	?	?	?	34	3993-2017
2017/10/26 01:15	19:15	North America	United States	United States/Wyoming	?	?	?	?	?	?	?	?	?	15	3992-2017
2017/10/25 02:33	19:33	North America	United States	United States/Washington	?	?	?	?	?	?	?	?	?	53	3955-2017
2017/10/25 02:24	22:24	North America	United States	United States/New York	?	?	?	?	?	?	?	?	?	31	3956-2017
2017/10/23 21:30	19:00	North America	Canada	Canada/Newfoundland and Labrador	?	?	?	?	?	?	?	?	?	11	3951-2017
2017/10/23 15:31:23	18:31:23	Asia	Saudi Arabia	Saudi Arabia/Northern Borders	35.4	16.7	-5.7	-10.7	-1.5	24	0.086	1.489	15.37	0	
2017/10/22 01:31	21:28	North America	United States	United States/North Carolina	?	?	?	?	?	?	?	?	?	20	3923-2017
2017/10/20 23:51	19:51	North America	United States	United States/South Carolina	?	?	?	?	?	?	?	?	?	10	3886-2017
2017/10/20 02:00	21:00	North America	United States	United States/Texas	?	?	?	?	?	?	?	?	?	11	3869-2017
2017/10/19 08:02	01:02	North America	United States	United States/California	?	?	?	?	?	?	?	?	?	10	3861-2017
2017/10/19 01:57	21:40	North America	United States	United States/Indiana	?	?	?	?	?	?	?	?	?	36	3845-2017
2017/10/19 01:38	21:38	North America	United States	United States/South Carolina	?	?	?	?	?	?	?	?	?	32	3844-2017
2017/10/19 00:11	19:11	North America	United States	United States/Arkansas	?	?	?	?	?	?	?	?	?	10	3839-2017
2017/10/18 19:01	15:01	North America	United States	United States/New York coast	?	?	?	?	?	?	?	?	?	236	3837-2017
2017/10/18 03:49	23:49	North America	United States	United States/Delaware coast	?	?	?	?	?	?	?	?	?	26	3810-2017
2017/10/18 00:59	20:59	North America	United States	United States/Vermont	?	?	?	?	?	?	?	?	?	12	3823-2017
2017/10/16 19:16	21:16	Europe	Germany	Germany/Bavaria	?	?	?	?	?	?	?	?	?	20	3769-2017
2017/10/16 08:04	01:04	North America	United States	United States/California	?	?	?	?	?	?	?	?	?	10	3745-2017
2017/10/16 03:17	23:17	North America	United States	United States/Virginia	?	?	?	?	?	?	?	?	?	16	3734-2017
2017/10/15 04:33:16	13:33:16	Antarctica	NA	Antarctica/Wilkes Land coast	24.1	15.9	9.5	-8.3	9.7	33	0.11	1.67	16.6	0	
2017/10/14 14:32	08:32	North America	United States	United States/Colorado	?	?	?	?	?	?	?	?	?	28	3714-2017
2017/10/13 06:20	23:20	North America	United States	United States/California	?	?	?	?	?	?	?	?	?	44	3711-2017
2017/10/09 12:51:48	08:51:48	South America	Bolivia	Bolivia/Santa Cruz	?	?	?	?	?	?	?	?	?	1	3625-2017
2017/10/09 09:53	02:53	North America	United States	United States/Washington	?	?	?	?	?	?	?	?	?	10	3624-2017
2017/10/09 02:55	19:55	North America	United States	United States/California coast	?	?	?	?	?	?	?	?	?	20	3618-2017
2017/10/08 03:08	22:08	North America	United States	United States/California coast	?	?	?	?	?	?	?	?	?	14	3607-2017
2017/10/08 00:35	20:35	North America	United States	United States/Maryland	?	?	?	?	?	?	?	?	?	37	3600-2017
2017/10/07 22:19	00:19	Europe	France	France/Auvergne-Rhône-Alpes	?	?	?	?	?	?	?	?	?	19	3598-2017
2017/10/06 20:18	22:18	Europe	Germany	Germany/Brandenberg	?	?	?	?	?	?	?	?	?	14	3587-2017
2017/10/06 03:00	23:00	North America	Canada	Canada/Quebec	?	?	?	?	?	?	?	?	?	11	3582-2017
2017/10/05 13:24	06:24	North America	United States	United States/California	?	?	?	?	?	?	?	?	?	11	3576-2017
2017/10/05 05:45	22:45	North America	United States	United States/California	?	?	?	?	?	?	?	?	?	11	3572-2017
2017/10/04 12:07:04	20:07:04	Asia	China	China/Yunnan	37.0	14.6	-8.5	-9.0	7.8	192	0.54	3.00	26.6	2	3554-2017

=== September ===
Date/time	Local time	Continent	Country	Location	Altitude (km)	Velocity (km/s)	Velocityx (km/s)	Velocityy (km/s)	Velocityz (km/s)	Energy (Gj)	impact energy (kt)	primary size (m)	impact size (m)	AMS reports	AMS event (if applicable)
2017/09/30 23:53	19:53	North America	United States	United States/Delaware	?	?	?	?	?	?	?	?	?	85	3501-2017
2017/09/29 22:55	18:55	North America	United States	United States/New Jersey	?	?	?	?	?	?	?	?	?	60	3490-2017
2017/09/27 04:42	23:42	North America	United States	United States/Wisconsin	?	?	?	?	?	?	?	?	?	11	3451-2017
2017/09/25 03:05	23:05	North America	United States	United States/Florida coast	?	?	?	?	?	?	?	?	?	11	3415-2017
2017/09/24 05:52	22:52	North America	United States	United States/California coast	?	?	?	?	?	?	?	?	?	60	3371-2017 (Note: Launch of an atlas V rocket)
2017/09/24 03:31	20:31	North America	United States	United States/Arizona	69.5	13.1	?	?	?	?	?	0.24	?	36	3367-2017
2017/09/24 00:12	20:12	North America	United States	United States/Indiana	?	?	?	?	?	?	?	?	?	11	3368-2017
2017/09/23 18:28	20:28	Europe	France	France/Provence-Alpes-Côte d'Azur	?	?	?	?	?	?	?	?	?	11	3370-2017
2017/09/23 00:20	20:20	North America	United States	United States/Pennsylvania	58.4	20.0	?	?	?	?	?	0.41	?	89	3345-2017
2017/09/22 20:20	22:20	Europe	Netherlands	Netherlands/Gelderland	?	?	?	?	?	?	?	?	?	21; 3	3343-2017; 3351-2017
2017/09/21 19:01	21:01	Europe	Netherlands	Netherlands/North Holland	?	?	?	?	?	?	?	?	?	479; 3; 4; 3	3301-2017; 3321-2017; 3323-2017; 3346-2017
2017/09/21 02:28	22:28	North America	United States	United States/South Carolina	?	?	?	?	?	?	?	?	?	26	3311-2017
2017/09/20 19:05	21:05	Europe	Netherlands	Netherlands/Flevoland	?	?	?	?	?	?	?	?	?	7; 3	3304-2017; 3307-2017
2017/09/19 21:19	23:19	Europe	Belgium	Belgium/Flemish region	?	?	?	?	?	?	?	?	?	31	3283-2017
2017/09/18 02:18	19:18	North America	United States	United States/California coast	?	?	?	?	?	?	?	?	?	21	3263-2017
2017/09/17 04:59	00:59	North America	United States	United States/Pennsylvania	?	?	?	?	?	?	?	?	?	207	3210-2017
2017/09/16 05:01	01:01	North America	United States	United States/Pennsylvania	?	?	?	?	?	?	?	?	?	12	3240-2017
2017/09/15 10:19	06:19	North America	United States	United States/Maryland	?	?	?	?	?	?	?	?	?	10	3209-2017
2017/09/14 19:06	20:06	Europe	United Kingdom	United Kingdom/England	?	?	?	?	?	?	?	?	?	15	3208-2017
2017/09/14 05:10	06:10	Europe	NA	North Sea	?	?	?	?	?	?	?	?	?	14	3205-2017
2017/09/11 02:53	19:53	North America	United States	United States/California	?	?	?	?	?	?	?	?	?	28	3140-2017
2017/09/10 19:28	21:28	Europe	France	France/Auvergne-Rhône-Alpes	?	?	?	?	?	?	?	?	?	92	3138-2017
2017/09/08 04:28	21:28	North America	United States	United States/California coast	?	?	?	?	?	?	?	?	?	31	3122-2017
2017/09/05 22:06	23:06	Europe	United Kingdom	United Kingdom/Scotland	?	?	?	?	?	?	?	?	?	12	3090-2017
2017/09/05 05:11:27	22:11:27	North America	Canada	Canada/Alberta	36.0	14.7	12.7	-6.1	-4.2	38	0.13	1.86	18.0	314	3068-2017
2017/09/02 06:58	02:44	North America	United States	United States/Michigan	?	?	?	?	?	?	?	?	?	18	3048-2017
2017/09/02 06:24	23:24	North America	United States	United States/Oregon	?	?	?	?	?	?	?	?	?	31	3047-2017

=== August ===
Date/time	Local time	Continent	Country	Location	Altitude (km)	Velocity (km/s)	Velocityx (km/s)	Velocityy (km/s)	Velocityz (km/s)	Energy (Gj)	impact energy (kt)	primary size (m)	impact size (m)	AMS reports	AMS event (if applicable)
2017/08/31 13:10	06:10	North America	United States	United States/California	?	?	?	?	?	?	?	?	?	22	3029-2017
2017/08/31 01:10	21:10	North America	United States	United States/Pennsylvania	?	?	?	?	?	?	?	?	?	10	3019-2017
2017/08/27 01:14	21:14	North America	United States	United States/Pennsylvania	?	?	?	?	?	?	?	?	?	10	2949-2017
2017/08/26 01:12:59	21:12:59	North America	United States	United States/Pennsylvania	52.3	12.9	?	?	?	?	?	0.30	?	921	2925-2017
2017/08/25 22:17	18:17	North America	United States	United States/Ohio	?	?	?	?	?	?	?	?	?	33	2921-2017
2017/08/19 01:42:15	21:42:15	North America	United States	United States/Pennsylvania	60.4	12.6	?	?	?	?	?	0.38	?	33	2822-2017
2017/08/17 20:42	21:42	Europe	United Kingdom	United Kingdom/England	?	?	?	?	?	?	?	?	?	19	2796-2017
2017/08/12 22:41	23:41	Europe	United Kingdom	United Kingdom/England	?	?	?	?	?	?	?	?	?	18	2658-2017
2017/08/10 21:07	22:07	Europe	United Kingdom	United Kingdom/England	?	?	?	?	?	?	?	?	?	10	2651-2017
2017/08/10 04:02	23:02	North America	United States	United States/Oklahoma	?	?	?	?	?	?	?	?	?	11	2639-2017
2017/08/07 08:47	04:47	North America	United States	United States/Florida	?	?	?	?	?	?	?	?	?	15	2610-2017
2017/08/06 04:56	21:56	North America	United States	United States/California	?	?	?	?	?	?	?	?	?	48	2579-2017
2017/08/06 03:46	23:46	North America	United States	United States/New York	?	?	?	?	?	?	?	?	?	17	2580-2017
2017/08/04 21:10	23:10	Europe	France	France/Nouvelle-Aquitaine	?	?	?	?	?	?	?	?	?	289	2563-2017
2017/08/01 10:13	06:13	North America	United States	United States/Georgia	?	?	?	?	?	?	?	?	?	21	2524-2017

=== July ===
Date/time	Local time	Continent	Country	Location	Altitude (km)	Velocity (km/s)	Velocityx (km/s)	Velocityy (km/s)	Velocityz (km/s)	Energy (Gj)	impact energy (kt)	primary size (m)	impact size (m)	AMS reports	AMS event (if applicable)
2017/07/31 22:01:35	14:01:35	North America	Mexico	Mexico/Baja California Sur coast	?	?	?	?	?	58	0.19	1.92	19.5	0	
2017/07/31 07:51	00:51	North America	United States	United States/California coast	?	?	?	?	?	?	?	?	?	10	2500-2017
2017/07/31 04:52	21:52	North America	United States	United States/California	?	?	?	?	?	?	?	?	?	21	2495-2017
2017/07/30 04:54	21:54	North America	United States	United States/Washington	?	?	?	?	?	?	?	?	?	888	2449-2017
2017/07/29 05:37	22:37	North America	Canada	Canada/British Columbia	?	?	?	?	?	?	?	?	?	10	2463-2017
2017/07/28 02:59	21:59	North America	United States	United States/Oklahoma	?	?	?	?	?	?	?	?	?	20	2443-2017
2017/07/26 01:57	21:57	North America	United States	United States/Florida	?	?	?	?	?	?	?	?	?	11	2414-2017
2017/07/25 05:28	00:28	North America	United States	United States/Texas	?	?	?	?	?	?	?	?	?	16	2405-2017
2017/07/23 06:12:38	01:12:38	South America	Brazil	Brazil/Amazonas	38.0	17.2	-0.4	8.7	-14.8	35	0.12	1.63	17.0	0	
2017/07/19 06:47	23:47	North America	United States	United States/California	?	?	?	?	?	?	?	?	?	10	2321-2017
2017/07/17 03:11	22:11	North America	United States	United States/Missouri	?	?	?	?	?	?	?	?	?	24	2298-2017
2017/07/16 01:54	21:54	North America	United States	United States/Pennsylvania	?	?	?	?	?	?	?	?	?	38	2249-2017
2017/07/15 06:39	02:39	North America	United States	United States/Kentucky	?	?	?	?	?	?	?	?	?	14	2248-2017
2017/07/14 23:16	00:16	Europe	United Kingdom	United Kingdom/England coast	?	?	?	?	?	?	?	?	?	10	2247-2017
2017/07/14 02:05	22:05	North America	United States	United States/Tennessee	?	?	?	?	?	?	?	?	?	91	2240-2017
2017/07/13 22:07	23:07	Europe	Belgium	Belgium/Walloon Region	?	?	?	?	?	?	?	?	?	11	2241-2017
2017/07/13 09:30:36	13:30:36	Asia	NA	Indian Ocean/Gulf of Oman	35.0	13.7	-10.0	-6.5	-6.8	73	0.23	2.36	20.7	0	
2017/07/13 09:16	05:13	North America	United States	United States/Florida coast	?	?	?	?	?	?	?	?	?	17	2242-2017
2017/07/11 10:55	05:55	North America	United States	United States/Texas	?	?	?	?	?	?	?	?	?	12	2237-2017
2017/07/09 21:19	18:19	South America	Brazil	Brazil/São Paulo	?	?	?	?	?	?	?	?	?	26	2227-2017
2017/07/07 03:39	22:39	North America	United States	United States/Texas	?	?	?	?	?	?	?	?	?	13	2174-2017
2017/07/06 21:26	23:26	Europe	France	France/Nouvelle-Aquitaine coast	?	?	?	?	?	?	?	?	?	10	2173-2017
2017/07/05 04:30	21:30	North America	United States	United States/California coast	?	?	?	?	?	?	?	?	?	32	2169-2017

=== June ===
Date/time	Local time	Continent	Country	Location	Altitude (km)	Velocity (km/s)	Velocityx (km/s)	Velocityy (km/s)	Velocityz (km/s)	Energy (Gj)	impact energy (kt)	primary size (m)	impact size (m)	AMS reports	AMS event (if applicable)
2017/06/30 14:26:45	23:26:45	Australia	Australia	Australia/South Australia coast	20.0	15.2	10.9	-9.7	4.2	94	0.29	2.38	22.2	1	2138-2017
2017/06/27 03:32	23:32	North America	United States	United States/South Carolina	?	?	?	?	?	?	?	?	?	13	2099-2017
2017/06/26 05:00	01:00	North America	United States	United States/Indiana	?	?	?	?	?	?	?	?	?	65	2081-2017
2017/06/23 20:21:55	08:21:55	Asia	NA	Sea of Okhotsk	35.1	24.3	17.7	13.1	-10.3	184	0.52		26.3	0	
2017/06/20 13:41:32	22:41:32	Australia	NA	Antarctic Ocean/Australia	33.0	13.6	8.7	-5.7	8.8	636	1.6	4.11	36.9	0	
2017/06/20 03:35	22:35	North America	United States	United States/Oklahoma	?	?	?	?	?	?	?	?	?	27	2026-2017
2017/06/19 01:08	21:08	North America	United States	United States/South Carolina coast	?	?	?	?	?	?	?	?	?	12	2011-2017
2017/06/18 04:44	23:44	North America	United States	United States/Texas	?	?	?	?	?	?	?	?	?	32	1997-2017
2017/06/18 02:29	22:29	North America	United States	United States/Maryland	?	?	?	?	?	?	?	?	?	14	1998-2017
2017/06/16 00:51	02:51	Europe	France	France/coast	?	?	?	?	?	?	?	?	?	33	1974-2017
2017/06/11 23:34	19:34	North America	United States	United States/Delaware coast	?	?	?	?	?	?	?	?	?	37	1918-2017
2017/06/10 03:25	23:25	North America	United States	United States/Florida coast	?	?	?	?	?	?	?	?	?	33	1891-2017
2017/06/08 02:11	22:11	North America	Canada	Canada/Ontario	?	?	?	?	?	?	?	?	?	12	1880-2017
2017/06/07 01:55	21:55	North America	United States	United States/Maryland	?	?	?	?	?	?	?	?	?	53	1872-2017
2017/06/01 22:38	23:50	Europe	United Kingdom	United Kingdom/coast	?	?	?	?	?	?	?	?	?	96	1808-2017

=== May ===
Date/time	Local time	Continent	Country	Location	Altitude (km)	Velocity (km/s)	Velocityx (km/s)	Velocityy (km/s)	Velocityz (km/s)	Energy (Gj)	impact energy (kt)	primary size (m)	impact size (m)	AMS reports	AMS event (if applicable)
2017/05/30 21:12	23:12	Europe	Italy	Italy/coast	?	?	?	?	?	?	?	?	?	16	1802-2017
2017/05/30 03:26	23:26	North America	United States	United States/New York	?	?	?	?	?	?	?	?	?	42	1790-2017
2017/05/29 02:27	21:27	North America	United States	United States/Iowa	?	?	?	?	?	?	?	?	?	11	1786-2017
2017/05/28 02:54	22:54	North America	United States	United States/Florida	?	?	?	?	?	?	?	0.8	?	24	1769-2017
2017/05/27 20:58	21:58	Europe	United Kingdom	United Kingdom/England	?	?	?	?	?	?	?	?	?	61	1768-2017
2017/05/26 05:39	00:39	North America	United States	United States/Texas	?	?	?	?	?	?	?	?	?	40	1739-2017
2017/05/26 05:01	00:01	North America	United States	United States/Illinois	?	?	?	?	?	?	?	?	?	26	1740-2017
2017/05/26 02:56	20:56	North America	United States	United States/South Dakota	?	?	?	?	?	?	?	?	?	11	1741-2017
2017/05/24 20:46	22:46	Europe	Belgium	Belgium/Walloon Region	?	?	?	?	?	?	?	?	?	14	1721-2017
2017/05/24 07:03:03	14:03:03	Asia	Indonesia	Sumatra coast	46.0	18.4	-6.5	-16.5	-5.0	90	0.28	1.88	21.9	0	
2017/05/22 17:44:39	06:44:39	Australia	NA	Pacific Ocean/South west	33.0	?	?	?	?	35	0.12	1.49	16.9	0	
2017/05/19 05:00	00:00	North America	United States	United States/Texas	?	?	?	?	?	?	?	?	?	16	1687-2017
2017/05/16 01:07	21:07	North America	United States	United States/New York	?	?	?	?	?	?	?	?	?	13	1669-2017
2017/05/14 09:30:35	11:30:35	Africa	Mozambique	Mozambique/Maputo	33.0	?	?	?	?	35	0.12	1.49	16.9	1	1660-2017
2017/05/08 06:47	23:47	North America	United States	United States/California	?	?	?	?	?	?	?	?	?	12	1616-2017
2017/05/08 04:03	21:03	North America	United States	United States/California coast	?	?	?	?	?	?	?	?	?	12	1614-2017
2017/05/05 10:09	03:09	North America	United States	United States/Arizona	?	?	?	?	?	?	?	?	?	11	1582-2017
2017/05/04 03:48	21:48	North America	Canada	Canada/Alberta	?	?	?	?	?	?	?	?	?	12	1575-2017

=== April ===
Date/time	Local time	Continent	Country	Location	Altitude (km)	Velocity (km/s)	Velocityx (km/s)	Velocityy (km/s)	Velocityz (km/s)	Energy (Gj)	impact energy (kt)	primary size (m)	impact size (m)	AMS reports	AMS event (if applicable)
2017/04/30 21:28:28	01:28:28	Africa	NA	Indian Ocean/West	32.4	21.5	-13.4	-14.2	8.9	150	0.43	1.95	24.9	0	
2017/04/27 22:34	18:44	South America	Brazil	Brazil/Mato Grosso	?	?	?	?	?	?	?	?	?	10	1534-2017
2017/04/27 20:38	22:38	Europe	Netherlands	Netherlands/North Holland	?	?	?	?	?	?	?	?	?	11	1512-2017
2017/04/27 04:26	00:26	North America	United States	United States/Virginia	?	?	?	?	?	?	?	?	?	10	1500-2017
2017/04/26 03:54	23:54	North America	United States	United States/Florida	?	?	?	?	?	?	?	?	?	87	1497-2017 (Note: Could possibly be man-made)
2017/04/25 19:01	21:01	Europe	Germany	Germany/Thuringia	?	?	?	?	?	?	?	?	?	17	1492-2017
2017/04/25 05:18	22:18	North America	United States	United States/Oregon coast	?	?	?	?	?	?	?	?	?	16	1457-2017
2017/04/24 02:00	21:00	North America	United States	United States/Texas	?	?	?	?	?	?	?	?	?	18	1458-2017
2017/04/21 20:49	21:49	Europe	United Kingdom	United Kingdom/England	?	?	?	?	?	?	?	?	?	12	1450-2017
2017/04/20 21:11	22:11	Europe	United Kingdom	United Kingdom/England	?	?	?	?	?	?	?	?	?	11	1436-2017
2017/04/19 03:08	22:11	North America	United States	United States/Florida coast	?	?	?	?	?	?	?	?	?	19	1414-2017
2017/04/18 18:16	13:16	North America	United States	United States/Texas	?	?	?	?	?	?	?	?	?	25	1407-2017
2017/04/16 07:57	17:57	Australia	Australia	Australia/Queensland	?	?	?	?	?	?	?	?	?	4	1363-2017
2017/04/15 02:07	22:07	North America	United States	United States/New York	?	?	?	?	?	?	?	?	?	214	1362-2017
2017/04/14 06:21	02:21	North America	United States	United States/Ohio	?	?	?	?	?	?	?	?	?	11	1361-2017
2017/04/13 00:43	20:43	North America	United States	United States/South Carolina	?	?	?	?	?	?	?	?	?	463	1337-2017
2017/04/11 04:00	21:00	North America	United States	United States/California coast	?	?	?	?	?	?	?	?	?	542	1298-2017
2017/04/09 05:58	01:48	North America	United States	United States/Indiana	?	?	?	?	?	?	?	?	?	27; 2; 1	1297-2017; 1300-2017; 1325-2017
2017/04/02 09:02	05:02	North America	United States	United States/Maryland	56.9	15.5	?	?	?	11	0.027	0.45	5.5	14	1210-2017
2017/04/02 06:49	02:49	North America	United States	United States/Florida	?	?	?	?	?	?	?	?	?	19	1211-2017

=== March ===
Date/time	Local time	Continent	Country	Location	Altitude (km)	Velocity (km/s)	Velocityx (km/s)	Velocityy (km/s)	Velocityz (km/s)	Energy (Gj)	impact energy (kt)	primary size (m)	impact size (m)	AMS reports	AMS event (if applicable)
2017/03/30 02:33	21:33	North America	United States	United States/Texas	?	?	?	?	?	?	?	?	?	69	1169-2017
2017/03/27 20:28	22:28	Europe	France	France/Centre-Val de Loire	?	?	?	?	?	?	?	?	?	16	1167-2017
2017/03/26 21:12	23:08	Europe	Belgium	Belgium/Walloon Region	?	?	?	?	?	?	?	?	?	18	1156-2017
2017/03/26 09:59	06:59	South America	Brazil	Brazil/Bahia	?	?	?	?	?	?	?	?	?	10	1216-2017
2017/03/24 23:48	00:15	Europe	France	France/Grand Est	?	?	?	?	?	?	?	?	?	11	1108-2017
2017/03/24 02:30	20:06	North America	United States	United States/New Mexico	71.7	20.5	?	?	?	13	0.031	0.39	5.7	42	1110-2017
2017/03/24 00:17	20:17	North America	United States	United States/Tennessee	?	?	?	?	?	?	?	?	?	12	1111-2017
2017/03/23 10:50	04:50	North America	United States	United States/Wyoming	?	?	?	?	?	?	?	?	?	19	1112-2017
2017/03/23 06:39	14:39	Asia	Russia	Russia/Irkutsk	?	?	?	?	?	?	?	>1	?	15	1137-2017
2017/03/22 10:18	06:18	North America	Canada	Canada/Ontario	?	?	?	?	?	?	?	?	?	57	1071-2017
2017/03/22 00:48	19:48	North America	United States	United States/Missouri	?	?	?	?	?	?	?	?	?	21	1075-2017
2017/03/22 00:40	20:40	North America	United States	United States/Pennsylvania	?	?	?	?	?	?	?	?	?	123	1074-2017
2017/03/21 11:33	06:33	North America	United States	United States/Wisconsin	?	?	?	?	?	?	?	?	?	19	1064-2017
2017/03/17 10:10	06:10	North America	United States	United States/New York	?	?	?	?	?	?	?	?	?	22	1011-2017
2017/03/17 05:36	22:36	North America	United States	United States/California	?	?	?	?	?	?	?	?	?	25	1010-2017
2017/03/17 04:37	21:37	North America	United States	United States/Washington	?	?	?	?	?	?	?	?	?	116	1012-2017
2017/03/17 02:26	22:04	North America	United States	United States/Indiana	?	?	?	?	?	?	?	?	?	19	1021-2017
2017/03/13 04:02	23:22	North America	United States	United States/Alabama	?	?	?	?	?	?	?	?	?	21	916-2017
2017/03/13 00:33	20:26	North America	United States	United States/North Carolina	?	?	?	?	?	?	?	?	?	17	917-2017
2017/03/11 04:51:21	00:51:21	North America	NA	Atlantic Ocean/North west	28.0	?	?	?	?	1263	2.9	4.32	44.1	0	
2017/03/10 04:54	22:58	North America	United States	United States/Wisconsin	?	?	?	?	?	?	?	?	?	14	936-2017
2017/03/09 04:16:37	03:16:37	Europe	NA	Atlantic Ocean/North east	23.0	36.5	-15.3	25.8	-15.3	400	1	1.8	32.2	0	
2017/03/08 22:21:59	10:21:59	Australia	NA	Pacific Ocean/South west	37.0	?	?	?	?	72	0.23	1.86	29.1	0	
2017/03/08 01:10	20:10	North America	United States	United States/Georgia coast	?	?	?	?	?	?	?	?	?	18	919-2017
2017/03/07 03:47	21:51	North America	United States	United States/Alabama	?	?	?	?	?	?	?	?	?	14	896-2017
2017/03/06 01:33	19:33	North America	United States	United States/Texas	?	?	?	?	?	?	?	?	?	11	894-2017
2017/03/05 01:10	20:10	North America	United States	United States/Florida	?	?	?	?	?	?	?	?	?	13	853-2017
2017/03/04 05:52	21:55	North America	United States	United States/California	?	?	?	?	?	?	?	?	?	36	850-2017
2017/03/04 04:15	22:15	North America	United States	United States/Texas	?	?	?	?	?	?	?	?	?	64	851-2017
2017/03/02 01:19	19:19	North America	United States	United States/Arkansas	?	?	?	?	?	?	?	?	?	15	842-2017
2017/03/02 00:52	18:52	North America	Mexico	Mexico/Coahuila	?	?	?	?	?	?	?	?	?	10	841-2017
2017/03/01 18:55	18:55	Europe	United Kingdom	United Kingdom/Scotland	?	?	?	?	?	?	?	?	?	27	834-2017

=== February ===
Date/time	Local time	Continent	Country	Location	Altitude (km)	Velocity (km/s)	Velocityx (km/s)	Velocityy (km/s)	Velocityz (km/s)	Energy (Gj)	impact energy (kt)	primary size (m)	impact size (m)	AMS reports	AMS event (if applicable)
2017/02/25 01:22:59	03:22:59	Africa	Libya	Libya/Jabal al Gharbi	25.4	12.2	-7.6	-9.3	-7.6	65	0.21	2.25	20.1	0	
2017/02/18 19:48:29	23:48:29	Africa	NA	Indian Ocean/Arabian Sea	38.0	24.2	-6.6	-22.7	-6.6	295	0.79	2.21	29.9	1(?)	680-2017(?)
2017/02/07 17:37:21	16:37:21	Africa	NA	Atlantic Ocean/South middle	54.0	?	?	?	?	20	0.073	1.265	14.6	0	
2017/02/06 06:09:59	15:09:59	Asia	NA	Pacific Ocean/Philippines coast	33.5	?	?	?	?	66	0.21	1.80	20.1	0	

== See also ==
- List of bolides
- Impact event
- List of meteor air bursts
