= Shock-resisting steel =

Variety of steel alloy

Shock-resisting steels are a class of tool steels designed to resist breakage by shock. Under the AISI classification system there are seven types, labeled S1 to S7.

== Overview ==
Shock-resisting steels are designed to have high impact resistance (toughness), along with other properties such as strength, hardness. Silicon is a common addition to this class of steels, as it provides tempering resistance and increases toughness.

Applications for shock-resisting steels includes springs, as well as chisels, dies for forging, and punches. S2 steel is also used to make ball bearings for the mining industry. They are also used for screwdrivers and driver bits.

Type	C %	Si %	V %	Cr %	Mn %	Ni %	Mo %	W %
S1 (UNS T41901) (Note: Commonly known as "tungsten chisel steel".)	0.40–0.55	0.15–1.20	0.15–0.30	1.00–1.80	0.10–0.40	<0.30	<0.50	1.50–3.00
S2 (UNS T41902)	0.40–0.55	0.90–1.20	<0.50	—	0.30–0.50	<0.30	0.30–0.60	—
S3	0.50	2.00	—	0.74	—	—	—	1.00
S4 (UNS T41904)	? ~0.4–0.65	1.75–2.25	0.35	0.35	0.60–0.90		—	
S5 (UNS T41905)	0.50–0.65	1.75–2.25	<0.35	<0.50	0.60–1.00	—	0.20–1.35	—
S6 (UNS T41906)	0.40–0.50	2.00–2.50	0.20–0.40	1.20–1.50	1.20–1.50	—	0.30–0.50	—
S7 (UNS T41907)	0.45–0.55	0.20–1.00	0.20–0.30 (Note: May be omitted.)	3.00–3.50	0.20–0.90	—	1.30–1.80	—

== SVCM ==
SVCM steel is a kind of shock-resisting steel. SVCM steel is an alloy of carbon, silicon, chromium, magnesium, nickel, molybdenum and lead. SVCM+ in addition is quenched and tempered achieving a high hardness (HRC 59). SCVM+ has better torsional properties than chromium-vanadium steel (Cr-V).
