= Let's Get Haunted =

American podcast

- Genre: Paranormal; comedy; horror

Cast and voices
- Hosted by: Alyssa Terry; Natalia Strawn

Let's Get Haunted (LGH) is an American paranormal and comedy podcast billed as "the only investigative journalism podcast about things that may or may not have even happened in the first place". The show is independently produced by the creators and hosts Alyssa Terry and Natalia Strawn.

== History ==
LGH was started by best friends Alyssa Terry and Natalia Strawn in February 2019 as a side project for both. The two met while attending college in California. They have stated that each episode takes anywhere from 24 hours to two weeks to produce from the research, recording, and editing processes. In its just over two-year run, the show has since grown from roughly 5,000 streams in its first month to more than 1,000,000 total and counting, supported by the paranormal-loving community known as "the Haunted Fam". As of July 2022, LGH has issued 113 full episodes, thirteen "Listener Stories" episodes, and three Q&A episodes through SoundCloud, Spotify, and Apple Podcasts.

Both Terry and Strawn are active in the LGH online community, frequently interacting with fans and members of the Haunted Fam through their Instagram, Twitter, Reddit, and Discord pages. Members are also often included in the show through submitted fan art and listener-contributed paranormal stories.

== Format and structure ==
Each episode of the show features a theme or central story which Terry and Strawn alternate recounting for the other and the listeners. The episodes air on Wednesday and usually range from 1–2 hours including introductions, though some episodes have been more lengthy given the cases or to allow time for the hosts and/or guests to discuss their reactions and theories. In a 2020 profile with Shoutout LA, the creators stated that they "research and discuss only things that [they] find interesting, that way the content never feels forced". Topics hail from around the world and throughout history, including but not limited to: popular folklore like The Mothman of West Virginia, internet cases and phenomena such as the Happy Valley Dream Survey and the Lake City Quiet Pills, true crime cases like the Setagaya family murders and the disappearance of Lars Mittank, and historical events like the Dyatlov Pass Incident, Operation Wandering Soul, and the Andes Flight Disaster. The hosts do thorough research about each case, often first providing background of the time and location for each story.

Before diving into the topic, the hosts typically open with "personal hauntings" or stories about their personal lives and careers, bringing a lighter tone and often comedic introduction to the heavier cases.

Given the paranormal focus and "haunted" title, LGH takes an open-minded perspective to each topic, and entertains a wide range of theories for each case without casting doubt or criticizing them. While the hosts have pointed out that this approach makes for a more entertaining show, it is also an example of the positive messages and inspiration they strive to provide through their work. In a 2020 interview with Charleston, West Virginia's Gazette-Mail, Strawn stated of the shows' perspective, "I invite all the people out there in the world who are seeing this article, instead of saying no, you don't have to say yes, just say maybe to possibilities...and I promise you...if you just apply that to your life, it will open up for you so much more".

While the hosts typically gather sources from the internet, books, and other media, there have been a few instances of the hosts conducting their own interviews or primary research for the episode. Perhaps the most notable occurred in the 17th episode of the show titled "The Jamison Family Disappearance", which follows the true story of the Jamison's 2009 disappearance and deaths as presented by Terry. For this episode, Terry was able to access court records for the family's prior lawsuits that many theorize could have been related to their disappearance, as well as interview a woman who was involved in a motor vehicle accident with the family several years before, providing new insight and information into their lives and the still-unsolved case.

In addition to their podcast, Terry and Strawn have attended AlienCon Los Angeles 2019 and the September 2019 Area 51 gathering, which they vlogged and posted to their YouTube channel.

== Notable guests ==
Occasionally, episodes feature guests in place of or alongside the hosts. Those include:

- Actor, comedian, producer and screenwriter Jamie Kennedy
- Actors/writers James DeAngelis, James Allen McCune, Cib & Sami Jo James, and Steven Suptic of Sugar Pine 7
- Voiceover actress Mimi Torres
- Author and Randonautica creator Joshua Lengfelder & researcher and parapsychologist Dr. Dean Radin
- Comedians and YouTube personalities James and Elyse Willems of Funhaus
- Comedians Steve Zaragoza and Mike Falzone of Dynamic Banter!
- Animator, creator and host of the podcast Stories with Sapphire, Sapphire Sandalo
- Bruce and Autumn Greene of Rooster Teeth's Sugar Pine 7, Funhaus, and Inside Gaming

== Philanthropy ==
In 2020, LGH was able to organize through its community of listeners and raise $1,897 for nonprofit organization The Loveland Foundation to help provide free therapy and mental health support and services to black women and girls in the United States.

Host Aly Terry works full time as a human resources representative for farms and farmworkers in Ventura County, California, and was able to find support to advocate for small farms in local government cases and ultimately overturn nuisance laws that threatened their livelihood.

In 2021, the podcast created a fundraiser to support the Lupus Foundation of America, donating proceeds from the month of July to the cause.

== Awards and nominations ==
In 2021, Let's Get Haunted was chosen as a finalist for Best Podcast at the Shorty Awards. They were awarded the Audience Honor for the Best Podcast category with the most fan votes of any podcast in May 2021.

LGH was one of ten nominees for Best Female-Hosted Podcast at the 2021 People's Choice Podcast Awards.

In April 2021, the podcast made their first appearance on Paranormality Magazine's monthly Top 25 Podcast chart at #4. They appeared at #1 for three consecutive months on the same list from June to August of the same year. They were also a finalist for Paranormality Magazine's Best Ghost Stories Podcast and Best Female-Lead Podcast of 2021.

== Episode list ==
Odd numbered episodes are hosted by Alyssa and even numbered episodes are hosted by Nat.

Episode Title	Air Date
Episode 1: The Dyatlov Pass Incident	February 5, 2019
Episode 2: Elisa Lam	February 18, 2019
Episode 3: The Abduction of Travis Walton	March 5, 2019
Episode 4: The Curse of the Lost Dutchman's Gold Mine	March 18, 2019
Episode 5: The Setagaya Family Murders	April 3, 2019
Episode 6: The Exorcism of Anneliese Michel	April 9, 2019
Episode 7: The Phantom Cosmonaut Conspiracy	April 22, 2019
Episode 8: Staircase in The Woods Phenomenon	May 1, 2019
Episode 8 1/2: Listener Stories #1	May 13, 2019
Episode 9: Doppelgängers	May 27, 2019
Episode 10: The Salem Witch Trials	June 5, 2019
Episode 11: The Lost Lighthouse Keepers of Eilean Mòr	June 12, 2019
Episode 12: MK Ultra	June 19, 2019
Episode 13: Haunted Ohio University	July 17, 2019
Episode 14: Area 51	July 31, 2019
Episode 15: The Haunted House of Black Forest	August 7, 2019
Episode 15 1/2: Listener Stories #2	August 21, 2019
Episode 16: Necromancy and Willows Weep	August 28, 2019
Episode 17: The Jamison Family Disappearance	September 11, 2019
Episode 18: Nazis in Antarctica	September 18, 2019
Episode 19: The Men In Black	September 25, 2019
Episode 20: The Portal to Hell in Stull, Kansas feat. James DeAngelis	October 9, 2019
Episode 21: The Haunted History of Halloween	October 16, 2019
Episode 22: The Watcher feat. Jamie Kennedy	October 23, 2019
Episode 23: The Greenbrier Ghost	November 6, 2019
Episode 24: Angela Sanford, the MySpace Witch feat. James Allen McCune	November 13, 2019
Episode 25: The Bell Witch Entity	November 20, 2019
Episode 25 1/2: Listener Stories #3	December 4, 2019
Episode 26: The Mothman	December 11, 2019
Episode 27: The Sodder Children feat. Mimi Torres & Lauren Holmes	December 18, 2019
BONUS! Q&A Season 1 Finale	December 25, 2019
Episode 28: Yetis, Ghosts, Trapped Souls, & Aliens - Haunted Mt. Everest	January 8, 2020
Episode 29: The Cursed Treasure of Oak Island	January 22, 2020
Episode 30: The Ritual Sacrifice of Mark Kilroy	January 30, 2020
Episode 30 1/2: Listener Stories #4	February 12, 2020
Episode 31: Scratching Fanny, the Ghost of Cock Lane	February 19, 2020
Episode 32: Roasted Fetuses Dipped in Gold - The Lore behind Kuman Thong	February 26, 2020
Episode 33: The Mysterious Disappearance of Lars Mittank	March 14, 2020
Episode 34: Real Japanese Curses & Urban Legends	March 18, 2020
Episode 35: Operation Wandering Soul & the Paranormal Side of the Vietnam War	April 17, 2020
Episode 36: Late Stage Cannibalism Aboard the Doomed Ghost Ship H.M.S. Terror	April 24, 2020
Episode 37: Indonesian Ghosts During Coronavirus	May 6, 2020
Episode 38: Charles "The Bewitched" Hapsburg & Inbreeding in The Royal Family	May 13, 2020
Episode 39: The Kennedy Curse	May 21, 2020
Episode 40: John Wayne Gacy and his haunted artwork	June 10, 2020
Episode 40 1/2: Listener Stories #5	August 5, 2020
Episode 41: Randonautica and Mind Matter Interaction feat. Joshua Lengfelder & Dean Radin	August 19, 2020
Episode 42: QAnon, Adrenochrome, & the 5th Dimension	August 26, 2020
Episode 43: The Happy Valley Dream Survey & The Willamette Valley Dream Survey	September 2, 2020
Episode 44: The Whaley House	September 10, 2020
Episode 45: The Pope Lick Monster of Louisville feat. Steven Suptic	September 16, 2020
Episode 46: The Black Death and the Haunting of Poveglia Island	September 23, 2020
Episode 47: The Murder of the Hammersmith Ghost feat. Elyse Willems & James Willems	October 8, 2020
Episode 48: Anatoly Moskvin's Black Magic Dolls feat. Cib & Sami Jo	October 14, 2020
Episode 49: Who put Bella in the Wych Elm? feat. Steve Zaragoza	October 22, 2020
Episode 50: Filipino Folklore feat. Sapphire Sandalo	October 28, 2020
Episode 50 1/2: Listener Stories #6	November 11, 2020
Episode 51: Lake City Quiet Pills	November 18, 2020
Episode 52: The Dibbuk Box	November 25, 2020
Episode 53: The Curse of Malaysia Airlines Flight 370	December 10, 2020
Episode 54: The Andes Flight Disaster	December 16, 2020
Episode 55: The Ritual Murder of Pastor Carol Daniels	December 23, 2020
BONUS! Q&A Season 2 Finale	December 30, 2020
Episode 56: The Paranormal Side of Sleep Paralysis: Night Hags & Sleep Demons	January 13, 2021
Episode 57: The Cryptids, Ghosts, and Mysterious Deaths of Lake Lanier	January 20, 2021
Episode 58: Time Travel & Paranormal Time Slips	January 27, 2021
Episode 59: Body Farms, Cremation, & Spontaneous Human Combustion	February 3, 2021
Episode 60: Madame LaLaurie's Haunted Mansion of Horrors & New Orleans Black Magic Voodoo	February 10, 2021
Episode 60 1/2: Listener Stories #7	February 17, 2021
Episode 61: The Lead Masks Case Feat. DYNAMIC BANTER!	February 24, 2021
Episode 62: Colobraro: Italy's Most Cursed Village	March 10, 2021
Episode 63: The Bélmez Faces And Other Andalusian Ghost Stories	March 17, 2021
Episode 64: The Curse of the Romanov Dynasty’s Missing Fabergé Eggs	March 24, 2021
Episode 65: Human Cannibalism and The Scottish Legend of Sawney Bean	March 31, 2021
Episode 66: UB-65, the Damned German Submarine of WWI	April 7, 2021
Episode 67: The Black Knight Satellite Conspiracy	April 14, 2021
Episode 69: The Mysterious Copper Cauldrons of Russia's Siberian Valley of Death*	April 20, 2021
Episode 68: Cannibals in National Parks (Viral Tiktok Story) feat. Bruce & Autumn Greene	April 28, 2021
Episode 70: The Dancing Plague of 1518	May 5, 2021
Episode 70 1/2: Listener Stories #8	May 12, 2021
Episode 71: The Beast of Bray Road and the Ghosts of Lake Geneva, Wisconsin	May 19, 2021
Episode 72: The Grim Reaper	May 26, 2021
Episode 73: Le Loyon aka The Ghost of Maules	June 2, 2021
Episode 74: The Mystery of the Witch's Seed - Changelings, Demonic Children, and Alien Hybrids	June 9, 2021
Episode 75: Hawaiian Folklore Feat. Kamuela Kaneshiro	June 16, 2021
Episode 76: The Anunnaki Conspiracy	June 24, 2021
Episode 77: Edward Brian McCleary's Escape From A Sea Monster	July 7, 2021
Episode 78: The Boogeyman	July 14, 2021
Episode 79: The Boy In The Box	July 21, 2021
Episode 80: Paranormal Games To Play In The Dark, Part I feat. James DeAngelis	August 4, 2021
Episode 80.5: Listener Stories #9	August 11, 2021
Episode 81: The Ningen	August 18, 2021
Episode 82: The Curse of The Scottish Play	August 2021
Episode 83: Indrid Cold, "The Grinning Man" (featuring witness testimony)	September 2021
Episode 84: Voergaard Slot - Denmark's Most Haunted Castle	September 2021
Episode 85: Haunted Crossroads Around the World	September 2021
Episode 86: Hans Christian Andersen's Dark Fairytales	September 2021
Episode 87: The Witches, Ghosts, and Werewolves of Moosham Castle	October 2021
Episode 88: The Mummy's Curse - Pharaoh Tutankhamun's Gold	October 2021
Episode 89: Japanese Folklore Feat. Reina Scully	October 2021
Episode 90: Haunted Alcatraz Prison Island	October 2021
Episode 90.5: Listener Stories #10	November 2021
Episode 91: Paranormal Games to Play in the Dark, Part II	November 2021
Episode 92: The Falcon Lake Incident Feat. Elliott Morgan	November 2021
Episode 93: The Christmas Tree Ghost Ship of Chicago	November 2021
Episode 94: Christmas Tree Jane Doe	December 2021
Episode 95: The Los Feliz Christmas Murder Mansion	December 2021
Episode 96: A Serial Killer Confesses Live On Howard Stern	December 2021
BONUS! Q&A Season 3 Finale	December 2021
Episode 97: The Khamar Daban Incident	February 2022
Episode 98: Summoning a Demon Feat. Chaweon Koo	February 2022
Episode 99: The Abduction of Frederick Valentich	February 2022
Episode 100: Joyce Mckinney & The Case of The Manacled Mormon	February 2022
Episode 100.5: Listener Stories #11	March 2022
Episode 101: The Enfield Horror	March 2022
Episode 102: Psychic Children Who Speak to The Dead	March 2022
Episode 103: Ariel School Aliens aka The Ruwa UFO Incident	March 2022
Episode 104: H.H. Holmes & The Murder Castle, Part I	April 2022
Episode 105: H.H. Holmes & The Murder Castle, Part II	April 2022
Episode 105.5: Listener Stories #12	April 2022
Episode 106: The M Cave and the Mysterious Disappearance of Kenny Veach	April 2022
Episode 107: The Black Carpet and The Black Diver	May 2022
Episode 108: Aimo Koivunen's Nazi Meth-Fueled Survival Saga	May 2022
Episode 109: Lake Vostok & Organism 46-B	May 2022
Episode 110: Subject X Theory (Viral TikTok Story)	May 2022
Episode 110.5: Listener Stories #13	June 2022
Episode 111: The Manson Family Murders, Part I	June 2022
Episode 112: The Manson Family Murders, Part II	June 2022
Episode 113: The Oakville Blobs Incident	June 2022

*Episode 69 appeared before Episode 68 on Tuesday, April 20, 2021
