= Kholat =

Kholat may refer to:

- The tomb of Kholat, daughter of Husayn ibn Ali and great granddaughter of Muhammad, in Baalbek
- Kholat Syakhl, a mountain in Russia
- Kholat (video game), a 2015 video game named after the mountain which the Dyatlov Pass incident took place
