= Igor Dyatlov =

Igor Dyatlov may refer to

- Igor Dyatlov (hiker) (1936–1959), leader of the group of hikers who died in the area of the Urals during the Dyatlov Pass incident
- Igor Dyatlov (politician) (born 1981), Ukrainian politician
