= Avi Loeb =

Israeli-American theoretical physicist (born 1962)

- אבי לייב
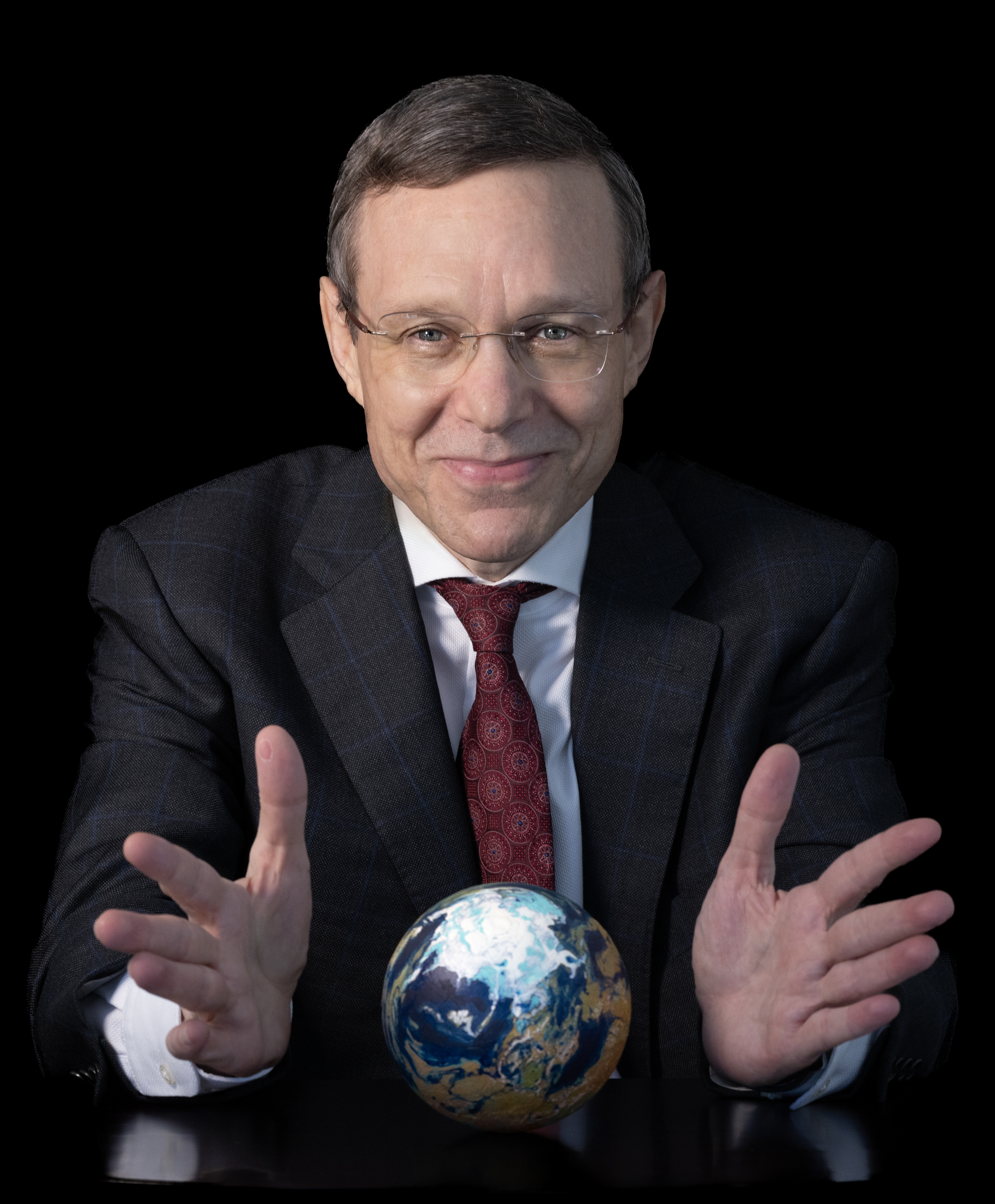
- Loeb in 2023
- Born: Abraham Loeb; February 26, 1962 (age 64); Beit Hanan, Israel
- Education: Hebrew University of Jerusalem (BSc, MSc, PhD)
- Scientific career
- Fields: Cosmology, astrophysics
- Workplaces: Institute for Advanced Study; Harvard University
- Thesis: Particle acceleration to high energies and amplification of coherent radiation by electromagnetic interactions in plasmas (1986)
- Doctoral advisor: Shalom Eliezer; Lazar Friedland
- Other academic advisors: John N. Bahcall
- Doctoral students: Daniel Eisenstein

Abraham "Avi" Loeb (Hebrew: אברהם (אבי) לייב; born February 26, 1962) is an Israeli-American theoretical physicist who works on astrophysics and cosmology. Loeb is the Frank B. Baird Jr. Professor of Science at Harvard University. He chaired the Department of Astronomy from 2011 to 2020, and founded the Black Hole Initiative in 2016.

Loeb is a fellow of the American Academy of Arts and Sciences, the American Physical Society, and the International Academy of Astronautics. In 2015, he was appointed as the science theory director for the Breakthrough Initiatives of the Breakthrough Prize Foundation.

Loeb has published popular science books including Extraterrestrial: The First Sign of Intelligent Life Beyond Earth (2021) and Interstellar: The Search for Extraterrestrial Life and Our Future in the Stars (2023).

Since 2017, Loeb has made a series of pseudoscientific claims that alien space craft may be in the Solar System. He has argued that ʻOumuamua and other interstellar objects, including the reputedly interstellar meteor CNEOS 2014-01-08, are potential examples of such craft. These claims have been widely rejected by the scientific community. In 2023, he claimed to have recovered spherules formed by the impact of CNEOS 2014-01-08 that he alleged could be evidence of an alien starship, but the location in the ocean where he recovered the spherules was based on mistaking a seismic signal from a truck for the impact of the meteor. Loeb tends to publicize his results before undergoing peer review, contributing to a climate of sensationalism around his claims.

== Life and career ==
Loeb was born in Beit Hanan, Israel, in 1962. He took part in the Talpiot research program while serving in the Israel Defense Forces at age 18. While in Talpiot, he obtained a BSc degree in physics and mathematics in 1983, an MSc degree in physics in 1985, and a PhD in plasma physics in 1986, all from the Hebrew University of Jerusalem (HUJI). During his doctoral studies, Loeb conducted research at the Soreq Nuclear Research Center in Yavne. His PhD thesis focused on the modeling of plasma acceleration of charged particles. From 1983 to 1988, he was invited by the U.S. Strategic Defense Initiative to work on a new propulsion method for high-speed projectiles. Between 1988 and 1993, Loeb was a long-term member at the Institute for Advanced Study at Princeton, where he started to work in theoretical astrophysics under the supervision of John Bahcall.

In 1993, he moved to Harvard University as an assistant professor in the department of astronomy, and was tenured three years later. Since 2007, he has been Director of the Institute for Theory and Computation at the Harvard-Smithsonian Center for Astrophysics. Since 2012, Loeb became the Frank B. Baird Jr. Professor of Science at Harvard.

Loeb has written eight books, including the textbooks How Did the First Stars and Galaxies Form? and The First Galaxies in the Universe. He has co-authored many papers on topics in astrophysics and cosmology, including the first stars, the epoch of reionization, the formation and evolution of massive black holes, the search for extraterrestrial life, gravitational lensing by planets, gamma-ray bursts at high redshifts, the use of the Lyman-alpha forest to measure the acceleration/deceleration of the universe in real time, the future collision between the Milky Way and Andromeda galaxies, the future state of extragalactic astronomy, astrophysical implications of black hole recoil in galaxy mergers, tidal disruption of stars, and imaging black hole silhouettes.

Together with his postdoc James Guillochon, Loeb predicted the existence of a new population of stars moving near the speed of light throughout the universe. Together with his postdoc John Forbes and Howard Chen of Northwestern University, Loeb made another prediction that sub-Neptune-sized exoplanets have been transformed into rocky super-Earths by the activity of the black hole Sagittarius A*.

Together with Paolo Pani, Loeb showed in 2013 that primordial black holes in the range between the masses of the Moon and the Sun cannot make up dark matter. In 2025, Loeb, in collaboration with Oem Trivedi, proposed that dark matter could consist of remnants of Planck Stars formed after the evaporation of primordial black holes. Loeb led a team that reported tentative evidence for the birth of a black hole in the young nearby supernova SN 1979C. In collaboration with Dan Maoz, Loeb demonstrated in 2013 that biomarkers, such as molecular oxygen (O_{2}), can be detected by the James Webb Space Telescope (JWST) in the atmosphere of Earth-mass planets in the habitable zone of white dwarfs.

In 2018, he served a term as chair of the board on Physics and Astronomy (BPA) of the National Academies of Sciences, Engineering, and Medicine (NASEM).

=== Life in the universe ===
In 2013, Loeb wrote about the "Habitable Epoch of the Early Universe", noting that the Cosmic Microwave Background would temporarily have been at temperatures compatible with liquid water around 15 million years after the Big Bang. In April 2021, he presented an updated summary of his ideas of life in the early universe.

In 2020, Loeb published a paper about the possibility that life can propagate from one planet to another, followed by the opinion piece "Noah's Spaceship" about directed panspermia.

=== Claims about alien life ===
Loeb's claims about alien life have attracted sustained criticism from other scientists. Steve Desch, an astrophysicist at Arizona State University referred to Loeb's claims as "ridiculous sensationalism" which represent "a real breakdown of the peer review process and the scientific method". Some of Loeb's claims have been described as conspiracy theories, with USA Today referring to Loeb's speculation about 3I/ATLAS as an "outlandish conspiracy theor[y]." Other scientists have described Loeb's theories as "nonsense", comparable to the idea that "the moon is made of cheese."

==== ʻOumuamua ====
ʻOumuamua was the first confirmed interstellar object detected in the Solar System. In December 2017, Loeb cited ʻOumuamua's unusually elongated shape as one of the reasons the Green Bank Telescope in West Virginia should listen for radio emissions from it to see if there were any unexpected signs that it might be of artificial origin, although earlier limited observations by other radio telescopes such as the SETI Institute's Allen Telescope Array had produced no such results. The Green Bank Telescope observed the asteroid for six hours, detecting no radio signals.

On October 26, 2018, Loeb and his postdoctoral student Shmuel Bialy submitted a paper exploring the possibility that ʻOumuamua is an artificial thin solar sail accelerated by solar radiation pressure in an effort to help explain the object's non-gravitational acceleration. The consensus among other astrophysicists was that the available evidence is insufficient to consider such a premise, and that a tumbling solar sail would not be able to accelerate. In response, Loeb wrote an article detailing six anomalous properties of ʻOumuamua that make it unusual, unlike any comets or asteroids seen before. By 2021, there was widespread consensus in the scientific community that 1I/ʻOumuamua had properties entirely consistent with a naturally occurring object, perhaps made of nitrogen ice, or a comet-like body that was altered by warming as it travelled through the solar system.

On November 27, 2018, Loeb and Amir Siraj, a Harvard undergraduate, proposed a search for ʻOumuamua-like objects that might be trapped in the Solar System as a result of losing orbital energy through a close encounter with Jupiter. They identified four candidates (2011 SP25, 2017 RR2, 2017 SV13, and 2018 TL6) for trapped interstellar objects that dedicated missions could visit. The authors pointed out that future sky surveys, such as with Large Synoptic Survey Telescope, could find many more.

In public interviews and private communications with reporters and academic colleagues, Loeb has become more vocal about the prospects of proving the existence of alien life. On April 16, 2019, Loeb and Siraj reported the discovery of a meteor of interstellar origin. Extraterrestrial: The First Sign of Intelligent Life Beyond Earth, a popular science account of ʻOumuamua by Loeb, was published in 2021.

==== The Galileo Project ====
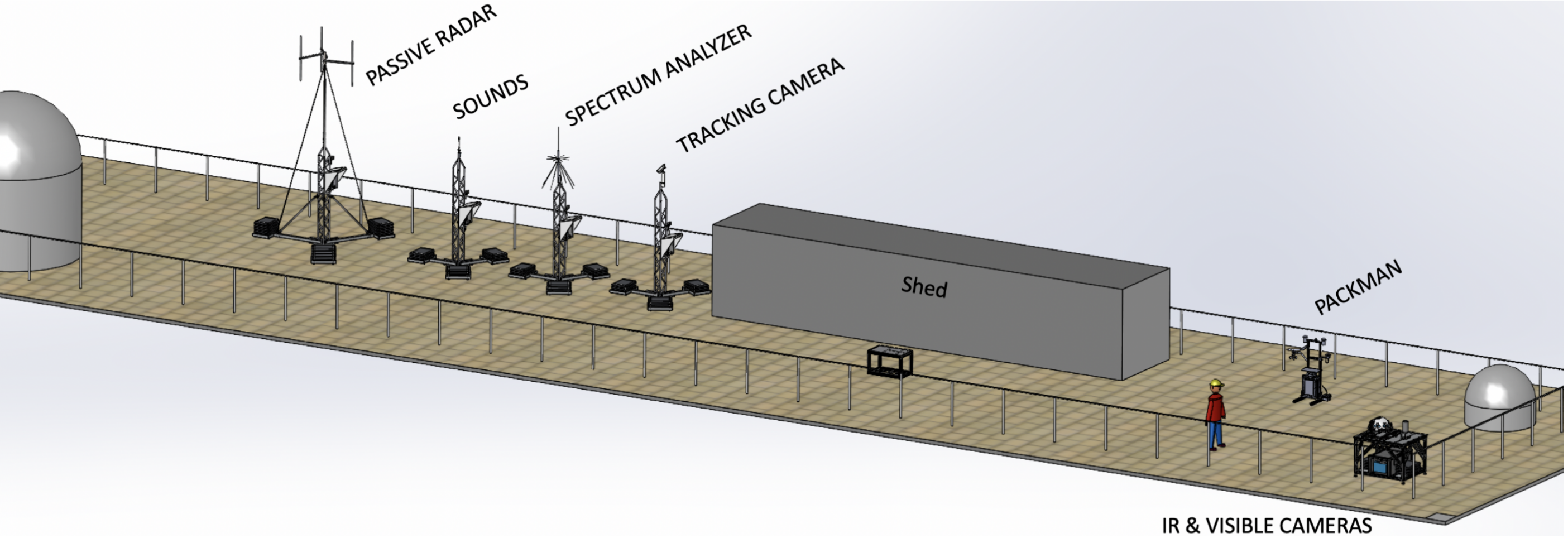
"Constructing new telescope systems to infer the nature of Unidentified Aerial Phenomena (UAP), similar to those mentioned in the ODNI report (ODNI 2021) to the US Congress"

In July 2021, Loeb founded the Galileo Project for the Systematic Scientific Search for Evidence of Extraterrestrial Technological Artifacts. The project was inspired by the detection of ʻOumuamua and by release of the Office of the Director of National Intelligence report on Unidentified Aerial Phenomena (UAP). As stated on the project's website, the aim is:

Given the recently discovered abundance of Earth-Sun systems, the Galileo Project is dedicated to the proposition that humans can no longer ignore the possible existence of Extraterrestrial Technological Civilizations (ETCs), and that science should not dogmatically reject potential extraterrestrial explanations because of social stigma or cultural preferences, factors which are not conducive to the scientific method of unbiased, empirical inquiry. We now must 'dare to look through new telescopes', both literally and figuratively.

The three main avenues of research are:

- Obtaining high-resolution images of UAPs and discovering their nature
- Searching for and research of ʻOumuamua-like interstellar objects
- Searching for potential ETC satellites

Unlike other similar projects, such as SETI, the goal of the Galileo Project is to search for physical objects, and not electromagnetic signals, associated with extraterrestrial technological equipment. The project was covered by many independent publishers, among them Nature, Science, The New York Post, Scientific American, The Guardian, etc. To allegations that studies of UFOs is pseudoscience, Loeb answers that the project aims not to study UFOs based on previous data, but to study Unidentified Aerial Phenomena "using the standard scientific method based on a transparent analysis of open scientific data to be collected using optimized instruments".

===== CNEOS 2014-01-08 =====
In 2014, the US Department of Defense observed a fireball entering the atmosphere. Loeb made a series of claims about this event, from the meteor being from outside the Solar System to its likely area of impact based on, among other things, a seismic signal that occurred around the same time, all culminating in 2023, when Loeb announced that he had found interstellar material on the ocean floor that he asserted came from the meteor and could be remnants of an extraterrestrial starship. These claims were criticized by other scientists as hasty, sensational, and part of a pattern of improper behavior. Peter Brown, a meteor physicist at the University of Western Ontario, argued the material can be explained as non-interstellar, noting that measurements from Defense Department data are opaque and error-prone. Brown further said he was disturbed by Loeb's lack of engagement with relevant experts. In March 2022, the U.S. Space Force affirmed that their 2014 data indicated an interstellar origin, while the following month NASA stated the evidence for this was inconclusive.

Astrophysicist Steve Desch, at Arizona State University, commented "[Loeb's claims are] polluting good science—conflating the good science we do with this ridiculous sensationalism and sucking all the oxygen out of the room", and said several of his colleagues are consequently refusing to engage with Loeb in the peer review process. Monica Grady from the Open University argued that the evidence for Loeb's claims is "rather shaky" and pointed more plausibly to terrestrial pollution. Patricio A. Gallardo in an American Astronomical Society paper similarly concluded the samples were consistent with coal ash contamination. Loeb subsequently authored a preprint saying chemical analysis ruled out coal ash contamination and indicated extrasolar origins. Loeb and Morgan MacLeod proposed a tidal disruption mechanism that could cause meteors to be ejected into trajectories leading to the described observations. In 2024 planetary seismologist Benjamin Fernando led a team that analyzed the seismic signals that led Loeb to search that specific region of the ocean, and they concluded that the seismic signals from one of the sensors used was in fact caused not by a meteor, but by a truck driving near the sensor, so that, "Not only did they use the wrong signal, they were looking in the wrong place."

==== 3I/ATLAS ====
In 2025, ATLAS (Asteroid Terrestrial-impact Last Alert System), the NASA-funded survey telescope in Rio Hurtado, Chile, observed a comet approaching from the constellation of Sagittarius at an interstellar velocity. Loeb hypothesized in the press that this, the third known interstellar object, could be an alien device with potentially malevolent intent. He based these speculations on his calculations of the likelihood of a comet of natural origins having these characteristics. "The retrograde orbital plane of 3I/ATLAS around the Sun lies within 5 degrees of that of Earth... The likelihood for that coincidence out of all random orientations is 0.2 percent," Loeb told Newsweek. He further claimed that the brightness of 3I/ATLAS implies an object that is around 20 kilometers in diameter which is "too large for an interstellar asteroid." 3I/ATLAS' trajectory will bring it close to Venus, Mars and Jupiter, a path Loeb calculated as having a probability of just 0.005 percent. "It might have targeted the inner Solar System as expected from alien technology," he added. Richard Moissl, Head of Planetary Defence at the European Space Agency told Newsweek: "There have been no signs pointing to non-natural origins of 3I/ATLAS in the available observations." Since then, observations have reported evidence of 3I/ATLAS containing water, which is a substance commonly found in comets.

Independent assessments have resoundingly rejected the idea that 3I/ATLAS is anything except a comet. Nicola Fox, associate administrator of NASA's Science Mission Directorate said that "We certainly haven't seen any technosignatures or anything from it that would lead us to believe it was anything other than a comet". Similarly, NASA Associate Administrator Amit Kshatriya stated that "all evidence points to it being a comet." In the face of this growing body of evidence, Loeb conceded that 3I/ATLAS is "most likely" a comet, though he continued to speculate about its supposed technological nature regardless.

=== Relationship with mainstream science since 2017 ===
Since 2017, Loeb's incorrect predictions that celestial objects are alien spaceships, his relationship with what Jalopnik describes as "nutty characters", and his interventions into areas of physics outside his background or work, have resulted in his increasing isolation from the scientific community.

According to the Chicago Tribune, Loeb's scientific peers consider him "outlandish and disingenuous, prone to sensational claims, more interested in being a celebrity than an astrophysicist — not to mention distracting and misleading". During an appearance at the Humanities Festival, moderator Dan Hooper responded to a comment by Loeb on the Large Hadron Collider by stating "one of us on this stage is a particle physicist and it’s not you".

As of 2023, according to the New York Times, some scientists were refusing to work with Loeb due to their contention he engaged in "ridiculous sensationalism". Writing in Big Think, Ethan Siegel credited Loeb's "outrageous and unsupportable claims" with helping draw attention to planetary science, despite what Siegel described as Loeb's own lack of expertise in the field.

=== Judaism and extraterrestrials ===
According to Loeb, the "fundamental question" is if the Ark of Covenant was a device used to communicate with extraterrestrials and if the Jewish people were chosen by a race of aliens and imbued with "information from beyond our planet". As reported by The Forward, Loeb contends that Earth may not be safe for the Jewish people and leaving Earth could be advantageous due to the absence of antisemitism in outer space. Writing on his Medium blog, he has posited that "with long-term thinking, Jewish eschatology could be extended to trillions of years if a Jewish community with its synagogues and extraterrestrial Temple is established".

In 2024, Loeb delivered a speech in which he declared his view that the Messiah will be an alien who arrives from outer space. In 2025, Loeb was the speaker at "Extraterrestrial Intelligence and the Jews", an event presented by Lehrhaus.

=== UAP Science Advisory Council ===
In June 2026, Loeb was named the chairperson of the newly formed UAP Science Advisory Council created at the request of the White House. The council will work in collaboration with federal agencies such as the Federal Bureau of Investigation, the all-domain Anomaly Resolution Office, and the Office of the Director for National Intelligence, but will have no budget and no access to classified material.

The council's makeup, according to The Guardian, was concerning to scientific observers since Loeb chose for its membership "apparently similar minds" including "UFO activists" and people who claimed the government was involved in a conspiracy to cover-up the existence of aliens. Mainstream scientists such as Sean M. Kirkpatrick and Steve Desch were critical of the effort, with Desch asserting that Loeb's involvement cast doubt on its very legitimacy.

=== Interstellar: The Search for Extraterrestrial Life and Our Future in the Stars ===
Interstellar: The Search for Extraterrestrial Life and Our Future in the Stars (also known as Interstellar) is a popular science book written by American theoretical physicist and Harvard University astronomer Avi Loeb that was published by Mariner Books on 29 August 2023.

Sarah Scoles of Undark Magazine describes the book as a detailed account of "what a future expedition to find remnants of the first space rock, which hit the Earth in 2014, might look like." She catalogues the eclectic contents, noting that "In the span of two pages, for instance, Loeb moves from Plato's Allegory of the Cave to the scientist who discovered the composition of stars to sunlight reflecting off the Moon to a solar telescope in Hawaii to the Parker Solar Probe in space to quantum tunneling (don't ask) to Sisyphus and Albert Camus."

Sarah Scoles of Undark Magazine states that "the book is a fairly disorganized, rambling affair whose topics and metaphors leap wildly to and fro", noting that while "There's value in thought experiments, what-ifs, and shaking up academic conformity when it's not adequately backed by data. But current scientific understanding doesn't support the base of Loeb's ideological pyramid." Freelance writer Patrick Rapa, writing in The Philadelphia Inquirer, enjoyed the work, though he acknowledges that "Loeb's peers are not on board. They call for caution and calm."

== Media appearances ==
In 2006, Loeb was featured in a Time magazine cover story on the first stars, and in a Scientific American article on the Dark Ages of the universe. In 2008, he was featured in a Smithsonian magazine cover story on black holes, and in two Astronomy magazine cover stories, one on the collision between the Milky Way and the Andromeda Galaxy and the second on the future state of our universe. In 2009, Loeb reviewed in a Scientific American article a new technique for imaging black hole silhouettes. Loeb received considerable media attention after proposing in 2011 (with E.L. Turner) a new technique for detecting artificially-illuminated objects in the Solar System and beyond, and showing in 2012 (with I. Ginsburg) that planets may transit hypervelocity stars or get kicked to a fraction of the speed of light near the black hole at the center of the Milky Way.

He has been profiled by media including Science magazine, Discover, and The New York Times. He has been interviewed by Astronomy magazine, by Lex Fridman, Let's Get Haunted, Joe Rogan, Mick West, and by the H3 Podcast. On August 24, 2023, The New York Times published an article about Loeb and his search for signs of extraterrestrial life. During an appearance on Joe Rogan's podcast, he also claimed that whether an ancient "sophisticated civilization" existed on Earth before humanity is a credible question to ask.

Loeb also regularly writes opinion essays on science and policy.

== Honors and awards ==
Loeb has received many honors, including:

- 1987 – The Kennedy Prize of the Hebrew University of Jerusalem
- 2002 – Guggenheim Fellowship
- 2004 – Distinguished Visiting Professorship at the Faculty of Physics & Einstein Center for Theoretical Physics of the Weizmann Institute of Science
- 2006/7 – John Bahcall Lecturer at the Tel Aviv University
- 2006 – Salpeter Lectureship at Cornell University
- 2012 – Time magazine's 25 most influential people in space.
- 2012 – Elected member of the American Academy of Arts and Sciences
- 2012 – Galileo Galilei Chair (Cattedra Galileiana) Award of the Scuola Normale Superiore, Pisa, Italy
- 2013 – Chambliss Astronomical Writing Award from the American Astronomical Society, for How Did the First Stars and Galaxies Form? (2010)
- 2014 – Member of the Board on Physics and Astronomy (BPA) of the National Academies of Sciences, Engineering, and Medicine
- 2015 – Elected Fellow of the International Academy of Astronautics (IAA) SETI Permanent Committee
- 2015 – Elected Member of the American Physical Society (APS)
- 2020 – Appointed to the President's Council of Advisors on Science and Technology

== See also ==
- UFO conspiracy theories
- CNEOS 2014-01-08

== Selected publications ==
- Abraham Loeb, Adam Hibberd, and Adam Crowl (2025). "Intercepting 3I/ATLAS at Closest Approach to Jupiter with the Juno spacecraft". arXiv.
