= Extraterrestrial: The First Sign of Intelligent Life Beyond Earth =

2021 book by Avi Loeb

- First edition cover (Hardcover)
- Author: Avi Loeb
- Publisher: Houghton Mifflin Harcourt (Hardcover)
- Publication date: 26 January 2021
- Publication place: United States
- Media type: Print (hardcover)
- Pages: 240
- ISBN: 978-0358278146

Extraterrestrial: The First Sign of Intelligent Life Beyond Earth (also known as Extraterrestrial) is a popular science book written by American theoretical physicist and Harvard University astronomer Avi Loeb, published by Houghton Mifflin Harcourt on 26 January 2021.

== Contents ==
The book describes the 2017 detection of ʻOumuamua, the first known interstellar object to pass through the Solar System. Loeb speculates that the object might be an extraterrestrial artifact, a suggestion considered unlikely by the scientific community collectively. Elizabeth Kolbert of The New Yorker magazine summarized the reasoning used by Avi Loeb about ʻOumuamua as follows:

It’s often said that “extraordinary claims require extraordinary evidence.” The phrase was popularized by the astronomer Carl Sagan, who probably did as much as any scientist has done to promote the search for extraterrestrial life. By what’s sometimes referred to as the “Sagan standard,” Loeb’s claim clearly falls short; the best evidence he marshals for his theory that ‘Oumuamua is an alien craft is that the alternative theories are unconvincing. Loeb, though, explicitly rejects the Sagan standard.

— The New Yorker

Besides ʻOumuamua, another interstellar object, the comet 2I/Borisov, has been detected passing through the Solar System. Loeb accepts that 2I/Borisov is a natural object but, asserts, against the scientific consensus, that ʻOumuamua may be artificial.

== Reviews ==
Jeff Foust, editor and publisher of The Space Review, comments that Loeb "fails to close the case that the object must be artificial ... Just because something can’t be immediately explained by natural phenomena doesn't mean it’s not natural." Further, "Perhaps ʻOumuamua will turn out to be the first of many in a new class of interstellar objects with an unusual, but natural, origin. Or, maybe, it will be like the “Wow!” signal, which was never seen again and its source never identified; mysterious, but not necessarily alien". Dennis Overbye, science writer for The New York Times, notes that the book is, "Few of his scientific colleagues agree with him, as Loeb will be the first to tell you in his new book, “Extraterrestrial,” which is part graceful memoir and part plea for keeping an open mind about the possibilities of what is out there in the universe — in particular, life." Reviewing for The New Yorker, Elizabeth Kolbert writes, "It seems a good deal more likely that [the book] will be ranked with von Däniken's work than with Galileo's," but concedes "it's thrilling to imagine the possibilities."

A followup book, entitled Interstellar: The Search for Extraterrestrial Life and Our Future in the Stars, was published on August 29, 2023.
