= Setagaya family murder =

Unsolved Japanese murder case

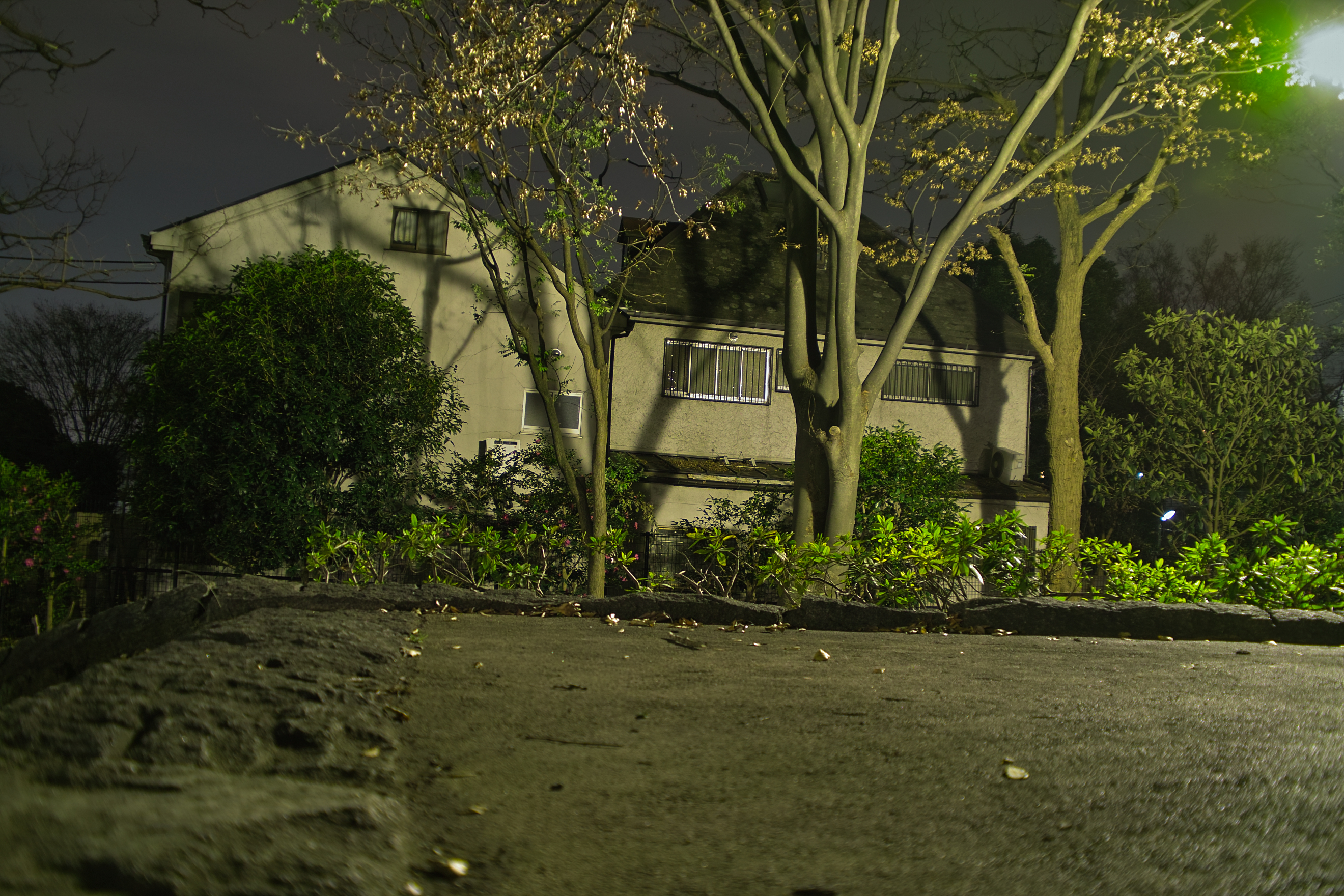
- Miyazawa family house at night seen from Soshigaya Park (photographed in December 2011)
- Location: 35°39′22.8″N 139°35′55.4″E; 3-chome Kamisoshigaya, Setagaya, Tokyo, Japan
- Date: December 30, 2000 to December 31, 2000; 25 years ago
- Target: Miyazawa family (4 people)
- Attack type: Mass murder, home invasion
- Weapon: Knife (2)
- Deaths: 4: 3 due to knife wounds; 1 due to strangulation
- Victims: Mikio Miyazawa, 44; Yasuko Miyazawa, 41; Niina Miyazawa, 8; Rei Miyazawa, 6
- Perpetrator: Unknown

The Setagaya family murder (Japanese: 世田谷一家殺害事件, Hepburn: Setagaya ikka satsugai jiken; Setagaya family killings) refers to the unsolved murders of the Miyazawa family in the Kamisoshigaya neighborhood of Setagaya, Tokyo, Japan, on the night of December 30 to 31, 2000.

Mikio and Yasuko Miyazawa, their daughter Niina and their son Rei were murdered during a home invasion by an unknown assailant who then remained in the family's house for several hours before disappearing. Japanese police launched a massive investigation that uncovered the killer's DNA and many specific clues about their identity, but the perpetrator has never been identified.

The media attention and long investigation of the murders became a cause célèbre to abolish the statute of limitations for crimes that could merit the death penalty in Japan, which was removed in 2010.

== Murders ==
At 10:40 a.m. on December 31, 2000, the bodies of 44-year-old Mikio Miyazawa, 41-year-old Yasuko Miyazawa, and their children, eight-year-old Niina and six-year-old Rei, were discovered by Yasuko's mother, Haruko, at their house in the Kamisoshigaya neighborhood of Setagaya, in the western suburbs of Tokyo. Mikio, Yasuko, and Niina had been stabbed to death while Rei had been strangled.

Investigation of the crime scene by the Tokyo Metropolitan Police Department (TMPD) concluded that the family had been murdered on December 30 to 31 at around 11:30 p.m. to 12:05 a.m. midnight JST, after which the killer stayed in the house for several hours. Takeshi Tsuchida, the chief of Seijo police station, was designated as the person in charge of the investigation at the time until his retirement.

The killer seemingly entered through the open window of the second-floor bathroom at the rear of the house, located immediately adjacent to Soshigaya Park, since investigators say the fly screen of the bathroom window which was found on the ground outside, and footsteps were found in the mud. There is a possibility that he gained access by climbing the fence, climbing up the air conditioning box, and then removing the window screen. The killer used his bare hands to strangle Rei, who was sleeping in his room on the second floor, killing him through asphyxiation. Several reports have said that Mikio rushed up the first floor stairs after he detected the disturbance in Rei's room, fighting and injuring the killer until being stabbed in the head with a sashimi bōchō knife. But there is no solid evidence indicating that Mikio detected a disturbance from upstairs when the killer had already, or was in the middle of, murdering Rei. A police report claimed that part of the sashimi knife's blade broke off inside Mikio's head. The killer then attacked Yasuko and Niina with the broken knife, before using a santoku knife from the house to murder them. In December 2019, it was reported that the handkerchief used to wrap the knife may be similar to those done in the Philippines by communities in Ilocos and Isabela, which made the TMPD consider sending officers there to investigate the possibility that the suspect was in the country.

The killer remained inside the house for two to ten hours, using the family computer, consuming four bottles of barley tea, melon, and four ice creams from their refrigerator, using their toilet and leaving his feces in the toilet without flushing, and treating his injuries using first aid kits and other sanitary products. Several reports have also said he took a nap on the sofa in the second-floor living room, but there is no way to verify this. Drawers and papers were ransacked (with some being dumped in the bath and toilet) and some money was taken, although more was left behind. The killer also left numerous items behind in the living area (knife, scarf, hip bag, shirt, jacket, hat, gloves, and two handkerchiefs). According to the Yomiuri in December 2014, he may have left the scene at night instead of the morning.

An analysis of Mikio Miyazawa's computer revealed that it had connected to the internet the morning after the murders from 1:18 a.m. to 1:23 a.m. Various news outlets have said the internet was connected again at around 10 a.m., around the time Yasuko's mother Haruko entered the house and discovered the murders, but it was reported by Nicolás Obregón that the killer was not the one who connected to the internet at 10 a.m. that morning; rather, it was Haruko, Yasuko's mother, accidentally waking the computer up by knocking the computer mouse with her arm, due to shock at the discovery of the crime scene. Haruko became suspicious after being unable to reach her daughter and visited the house, but received no answer after ringing the doorbell. Several reports have said the killer cut the phone lines before he murdered the family, but according to Nicolás Obregón, that did not happen.

== Investigation ==
Police have been able to deduce several very specific clues to the perpetrator's identity, but have been unable to produce or apprehend a suspect. It was determined that the killer had eaten string beans and sesame seeds the previous day after analyzing feces from the killer in the Miyazawas' bathroom. They determined that the clothes and sashimi knife left behind by the killer had been purchased in Kanagawa Prefecture. It was reported that more than 100,000 yen in cash was stolen from the house. Police also learned that only 130 units of the killer's shirt were made and sold, but they have only been able to track down twelve of the people who bought the shirts. Trace amounts of sand were also found inside the hip bag that the perpetrator left at the scene, which after analysis was determined to come from the Nevada desert, more specifically the area of Edwards Air Force Base in California and a skate park in Japan. The shoes used by the suspect were made in South Korea, but were marketed by British sports shoe company Slazenger.

"Operation Roller" was conducted when officers, including those conducting anti-riot and public security duties, were called in to assist their colleagues to go around the neighborhood and collect fingerprints from the locals.

On April 9, 2001, a Jizo statue was placed at the Sengawa River, which was located west of the Miyazawa residence. It was placed there on the 100th day after the incident, with reports saying the theory suggesting that someone who was involved in the incident may have placed it there. In December 2025, an ANN News report indicated that the Jizo statue found by the river has lettering that is similar to the one found on a stonemason's website.

In December 2013, 3D printing was used to create a model of the Miyazawas' residence for investigations.

On December 17, 2021, the TMPD reported that new technology allowed them to visually identify a person of interest who purchased a knife, which was the same weapon used by the suspect. However, the said person's DNA did not match the suspect's and was ruled out.

On December 29, 2025, a Kuchikomi feature article suggested that the TMPD should rethink the motive for the murders by pointing out to the 2002 murder case of Takaichi Mabuchi's wife and daughter, the killers misleading police by making the scene look like personal grudge when they stole hundreds of thousands of yen in cash and jewelry.

On December 23, 2025, some reports were made that the second floor window in the Miyazawa residence was always left open for ventilation, according to a neighbor. This gave credence to the theory that the killer was familiar with the house's layout. On December 31, 2025, investigators made calls for anyone who can help identify persons of interest who may know the family personally or are familiar with the area the Miyazawa house was in.

=== Suspect ===
Investigators found the killer's DNA and fingerprints throughout the house, but none matched their databases, indicating that they do not have a criminal record. Physically, the killer is believed to be around 170 centimetres (5.6 ft) tall and of thin build. The police estimated that the killer was born between 1965 and 1985 (15 to 35 years old at the time of the incident) due to the physicality required for entering the Miyazawa house and committing the murders. The first initial guess of the killer's age was 15 to 40 years old. In 2018, the TMPD released new information that they had revised the killer's age down to 15 to 20-22 years old. In July 2025, new reports have indicated that the suspect is estimated to be at least in his 30s when the murders took place and would be in his 50s or 60s as of 2025.The Miyazawas' wounds indicate that the killer is likely to be right-handed and bloodstain evidence suggests that "he probably injured his hand(s) during the commission of murder".

The killer's blood was found during an analysis of the murder scene that revealed traces of Type A blood, which would not have belonged to the Miyazawa family. A DNA analysis of the Type A blood determined the killer is male and possibly mixed race, with maternal DNA indicating a mother of European descent, possibly from a South European country near the Mediterranean or Adriatic Sea, and paternal DNA indicating a father of East Asian descent.

It is considered possible that the European maternal DNA comes from a distant ancestor from the mother's line rather than a fully European mother. Analysis of the Y-chromosome showed the Haplogroup O-M122, a common haplogroup distributed in East Asian peoples, appearing in 1 in 4 or 5 Koreans, 1 in 10 Chinese, and 1 in 13 Japanese. In July 2025, further news reports from Japan indicate the mother's ancestry in the Caucasus region or from the United Arab Emirates.

These results brought the TMPD to seek assistance through the International Criminal Police Organization as the killer may not be Japanese or present in Japan. The TMPD previously requested assistance from South Korea by accessing information on fingerprints, but it reportedly had no leads.

== Legacy ==
The investigation into the murders is among the largest in Japanese history, involving over 280,000 investigators who have collected over 16,000 pieces of evidence. All evidence related to the case remains in custody.

In 2015, it was reported that forty officers were assigned to the case full-time. In 2019, it was reported that 35 officers are still assigned to the case. Every year, the TMPD makes a pilgrimage to the house for memorial ceremonies and offered flowers. Tsuchida joined the NPO "Sora no Kai" as a special advisor after leaving the TMPD.

In 2015, An Irie, older sister of Yasuko Miyazawa, filed a complaint to the Broadcast and Human Rights and Other Related Rights Committee of the Broadcasting Ethics & Program Improvement Organization after she claimed that the TV Asahi documentary aired in 2014 misrepresented her after a TV Asahi reporter and ex-FBI agent used profiling to back a theory that the killer murdered the Miyazawas out of resentment.

In 2019, the TMPD announced that the Miyazawa house would be torn down because of its age and risk of collapsing, with the interior already showing signs of deterioration. Police said that demolishing the house would have no impact on the investigation, as all evidence from the interior had already been preserved. The move was appealed by the family and supporters.

In 2022, Universal Audio/USG launched the podcast Faceless, a deep dive into the Setagaya Murders. Written and presented by author Nicolás Obregón, the podcast calls into question many of the accepted narratives surrounding the case. Obregón interviews former TMPD Chief Takeshi Tsuchita at length, as well as Setsuko Miyazawa (mother to Mikio, grandmother to Niina and Rei).

On November 23, 2023, 10 high school students reportedly broke into the site of the Miyazawa residence, conducting a test of courage. The TMPD said that the minors would be prosecuted under the Minor Offenses Act. They were suspected of entering the area by climbing over a fence, but they did not enter the house. In response, new "No trespassing" signs were put up and more foot patrols were stepped up. On December 9, 2023, the TMPD conducted a campaign by distributing flyers and other materials at Seijōgakuen-mae Station, appealing for information on the case.

On December 5, 2025, Fuji TV won Asian Academy Creative Award 2025 in Singapore with their program "New Testimony x New Facts: The Key to Solution" winning the top prize in the News Program category. On December 30, 2025, the TMPD uses the case as teaching material for new officers who join the department to ensure they would know of the incident.

On May 14, 2026, two Vietnamese nationals were arrested following a burglary at the Miyazawa residence. Both men admitted to the charges and stated they were unaware of the house's history. During the time of the break-in, the victims' slippers and belongings were organized in cardboard boxes inside the house.

=== Laws ===
On May 27, 2024, the Setagaya Ward Assembly passed a motion for Tokyo to use DNA evidence and promote its use, including expansion of DNA information. In December 2024, the Sora no Kai handed a request for creating a law on DNA evidence. The rules of handling DNA in Japan are different, as there are no national guidelines and the TMPD operates based on regulations provided under the National Public Safety Commission Regulations.

=== Reward ===
As of December 2021, there was a ¥20 million reward for information leading to the arrest of the killer.

== See also ==
- List of unsolved murders (2000–present)
