= Chivruay Pass incident =

1973 death of ten Soviet ski hikers

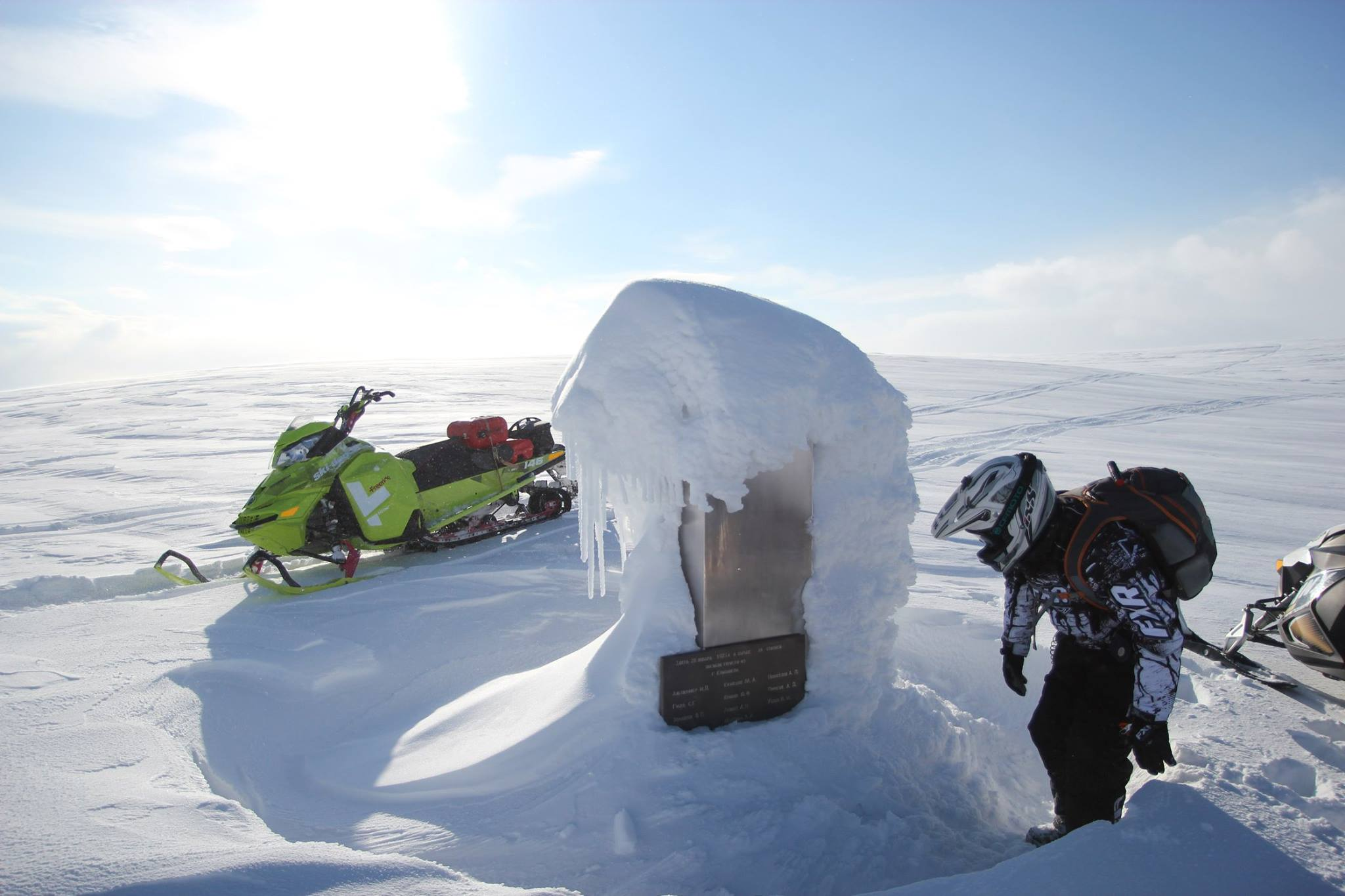
- Obelisk at the site of the tragedy
- Native name: Чивруайская трагедия
- Date: 27–28 January 1973
- Venue: Chivryay Pass
- Location: Lovozero Massif, Kola Peninsula, Russian SFSR, Soviet Union; 67°45′05″N 34°41′06″E
- Type: Multiple deaths
- Participants: Ski hikers from Kuibyshev Aviation Institute
- Deaths: 10 dead from hypothermia

The Chivruay Pass incident (Russian: Чивруайская трагедия, transl. Chivruay tragedy) is the death of ten ski hikers in the Lovozero Massif in the Soviet Union between 27 and 28 January 1973. The trekking group, who were all from the Kuibyshev Aviation Institute, had been hiking the slopes of Lovozero Massif in an area of Chivruay Pass.

After the group's bodies were discovered, an investigation by Soviet Union authorities determined that all ten had died from hypothermia.

== Participants ==
- Михаил Кузнецов – Mikhail Kuznetsov (24) – leader of the group
- Сергей Гусев – Sergey Gusev (17)
- Юрий Кривов – Yuri Krivov (17)
- Александр Новосёлов – Alexander Novosyolov (18)
- Анатолий Пирогов – Anatoly Pirogov (17)
- Лидия Мартина – Lydia Martina (26)
- Юрий Ушков – Yuri Ushkov (18)
- Валентин Землянов – Valentin Zemlyanov (23)
- Артём Лекант – Artyom Lekant (17)
- Илья Альтшуллер – Ilya Altshuller (23)

== Bibliography ==
- Волков Е. Из похода не вернулись // Турист. — 1973. — No. 6. — С. 12–13.
- Лукоянов П. И. Чивруайская трагедия // Безопасность в лыжных походах и чрезвычайных ситуациях зимних условий — М.: ЦДЮТур РФ, 1998, — С. 81, 121—122.
- Забытая трагедия на Чивруае // Наше время. – Новокуйбышевск. – декабрь 2017.
- Шабалина И. Исторические версии. О гибели десяти куйбышевцев во время лыжного похода по Кольскому полуострову // Самарская газета от 25 марта 2018.
- Назарова А. «Случившееся обросло загадками»: Нижегородец собрался в экспедицию на Кольский полуостров // Комсомольская правда от 23 января 2019.
- Андреева Е. По следам, заметённым десятками зим // Мурманский вестник. — 13 февраля 2019. — С. 1, 4.
- Как в 1973 году при странных обстоятельствах в горах Кольского полуострова погибли туристы. https://news.rambler.ru/other/41786563-kak-v-1973-godu-pri-strannyh-obstoyatelstvah-v-gorah-kolskogo-poluostrova-pogibli-turisty/?updated

== See also ==
- Dyatlov Pass incident
- Khamar-Daban incident
- (in Russian) Disappearance of the Klochkov's group of tourists
