= Kholat (video game) =

2015 survival horror video game

- Developer: IMGN.PRO
- Engine: Unreal Engine 4
- Platforms: Windows; PlayStation 4; Xbox One; Nintendo Switch
- Release: Windows; 9 June 2015; PS4; 8 March 2016; Xbox One; 9 June 2017; Switch; 14 May 2020
- Genre: Survival horror
- Mode: Single-player

Kholat is a survival horror game developed by IMGN.PRO, in which the player controls a protagonist who is tracing the steps of a group of nine Russian college students who went missing in February 1959 on Kholat Syakhl. The game is based on the Dyatlov Pass incident, a true event that involved ten Russian students, nine of which went missing on Kholat Syakhl and were found dead in the time span of four months (the tenth student had walked back earlier due to illness). Холатчахль ("Kholat Syakhl") is a transliteration in Russian of Holatchahl, meaning "Dead Mountain" in Mansi.

The game was released for Windows on 9 June 2015. It was released on the Nintendo Switch on 14 May 2020. It was also released in Japan on 17 September 2020, via Phoenixx.

== Plot ==
The game opens with a narrator (voiced by Sean Bean) explaining the details of the Dyatlov Pass Incident right before the player arrives in Ivdel by train, retracing the Dyatlov party's footsteps in this manner. Beginning their hike, the weather begins to worsen, and they spot glowing orange footprints in the snow. After exiting a tunnel the player falls through a hole in the ground but then instantly finds themselves on the mountainside near a bivouac site, where they go to sleep. Waking up, the player finds a glowing crater containing a meteorite, levitating pillar-like boulders with glowing inscriptions, a bright orange light in the sky, and several glowing, humanoid figures. Following their trails, the narrator comes across many notes from an investigator with the Russian Research Unit for Natural Phenomena (RRUNP) named Vitalij G., a mysterious man named Anton, and other individuals as well as news articles and classified government documents.

The player explores a wide range of notable locations scattered across a vast valley, such as an abandoned church, a cosmodrome, several campsites, an altar lined with totem-pole-like torches. They also begin collecting a series of coordinates which lead them to more clues while being pursued by hostile, shadow-like creatures, who must be avoided at all costs.

Piecing together the notes, in 1950 the Kremlin created the RRUNP with the aim of studying and understanding a mysterious paranormal phenomenon called "Anomaly 7" in the Ural Mountains. This anomaly has been linked to a wide range of bizarre incidents; one such occurring in Igarka in 1950, halting the construction of the Salekhard–Igarka Railway. Other incidents included the inexplicable disintegration or solidification of dozens of gulag prisoners, the appearance of moving lights in the sky, and strange, orange gas that kills or maddens those who contact it. A branch of the Unit called Section 22 conducted inhumane experiments on convicts simply called "subjects." Vitalij, a member of the Unit, was dispatched to locate the victims of the Dyaltlov Pass Incident in relation to the Anomaly but suffered an unexplained mental breakdown as a result of finding their bodies in horrible condition. He later assaulted his wife Viktoria in a fit of madness and was permanently committed to an asylum in Moscow, on suspicion of having an accomplice murder Viktoria's sister. Finally reaching the dreaded pass, the player again encounters the levitating stones, and opening their notebook the pages begin to fly off into the wind as they pass out.

Awaking in pitch darkness, the player is drawn towards an orange glow at the peak of the mountain as the narrator's angered voice begins to echo in their ears. Finding a tent, they enter, and the screen fades to black as a woman's scream can be heard.

If the player collects every note, a voice clip will play over a black screen revealing the narrator to be Anton, attending to the player on their deathbed. Attempting to turn off the player's life support, he panics when he realizes the player is conscious and can hear him.

== Reception ==
Kholat received mixed to positive reviews from critics. Aggregating review website GameRankings provides an average rating of 64.29% based on 21 reviews, whereas Metacritic provides an average rating of 64 out of 100 based on 38 reviews, meaning mixed or average reviews. Portuguese website ComboCaster praised the ambience but said the technical issues prevented it from being very immersive.
