= Kamisoshigaya =

Kamisoshigaya 上祖師谷
- District
- Location within Special wards of Tokyo
- Coordinates: 35°39′25.32″N 139°35′46.92″E
- Country: Japan
- City: Tokyo
- Ward: Setagaya

Population (September 1, 2019)
  - Total: 19,449
- Time zone: UTC+9 (JST)
- Postal code: 157-0065
- Area code: 03

Kamisoshigaya (上祖師谷) is a district of Setagaya, Tokyo, Japan.

== Education ==
Setagaya Board of Education operates public elementary and junior high schools.

Parts of 1-3-chome are zoned to Tsukado Elementary School (塚戸小学校). 6-7-chome and parts of 1-2-chome are zoned to Karasuyama Elementary School (烏山小学校). 4-5-chome and the rest of 3-chome are zoned to Chitose Elementary School (千歳小学校). 4-7-chome and parts of 1 and 2-chome are zoned to Kamisoshigaya Junior High School (上祖師谷中学校). 3-chome and parts of 1-2-chome are zoned to Chitose Junior High School (千歳中学校).
