= Khamar-Daban incident =

1993 unsolved deaths in Russia

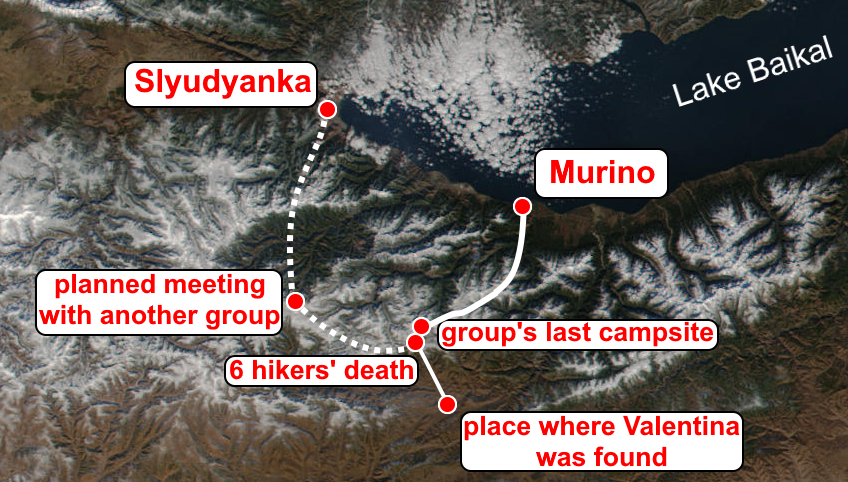
- Map of the hikers' route
- Native name: Гибель тургруппы Коровиной
- Date: 5 August 1993
- Location: Khamar-Daban mountain range, Siberia, Buryatia, Russia; 51°11′41″N 103°58′06″E
- Type: 6 deaths
- Cause: hypothermia
- Deaths: 6 hikers from Petropavl: 5 officially due to hypothermia; 1 officially due to a heart attack

On 5 August 1993, six Kazakhstani hikers died in the Khamar-Daban mountain range under uncertain circumstances. The event has been likened to the Dyatlov Pass incident, earning it the name "Buryatia's Dyatlov Pass".

The six hikers who died were members of a seven-person hiking group led by Lyudmila Korovina; Valentina Utochenko was the group's sole survivor. Despite the police receiving a report, no formal search was carried out until 24 August. It took two days for helicopters to locate the remains, because Utochenko had not yet been able to recount her version of what had happened. According to an autopsy report, all of the victims died of hypothermia, except Korovina, who died from a heart attack.

== Background ==
Khamar-Daban, a mountain range in southern Siberia, in the Republic of Buryatia, Russia, was a popular tourist hiking spot. In the summer of 1993, Lyudmila Korovina of the Petropavl "Azimut" tourist club, an experienced hiking instructor and a Master of Sports in hiking, planned a hiking trip to the Khamar-Daban mountains. She was joined by six of her students: Aleksander "Sacha" Krysin, Tatyana Filipenko, Denis Shvachkin, Valentina "Valya" Utochenko, Viktoriya Zalesova and Timur Bapanov. Korovina had previous experience hiking in the Khamar-Daban area, and the students trained with her for the trip.

Members of the hiking trip
| Name | | Birthdate | Age | Sex |
| Cyrillic script | Romanization | Birthdate | Age | Sex |
|---|---|---|---|---|
| Людмила Ивановна Коровина | Lyudmila Ivanovna Korovina | 21 November 1951 | 41 | Female |
| Татьяна Юрьевна Филипенко | Tatiana Yurievna Filipenko | 5 January 1969 | 24 | Female |
| Александр Геннадиевич Крысин | Alexander Gennadievich Krysin | 6 July 1970 | 23 | Male |
| Денис Викторович Швачкин | Denis Viktorovich Shvachkin | 23 April 1974 | 19 | Male |
| Валентина Уточенко | Valentina Utochenko | 18 September 1975 | 17 | Female |
| Виктория Залесова | Viktoriya Zalesova | 23 October 1976 | 16 | Female |
| Тимур Балгабаевич Бапанов | Timur Balgabaevich Bapanov | 15 July 1978 | 15 | Male |

== The trip ==
The group of seven hikers, led by Korovina, arrived in Irkutsk by train in August 1993. Korovina's hiking group was one of three in the area, one of which was being led by her daughter, Natalia. Starting on 2 August 1993, their trip led from the village of Murino, along the Langutai river, through the Langutai Gates pass, along the Barun-Yunkatsuk river, up the Khanulu mountain and along its ridge, ending on the watershed plateau of the Anigta and Baiga rivers. Korovina's group was meant to cross paths with her daughter's on 5 August.

The first two days of the hike turned out to have gone better than the group had planned, with them making good time up Retranslyator peak; however, on 4 August, as they were beginning their descent, they were hit with an unexpected rainstorm. Korovina decided to make camp in an exposed location, with the group failing at an attempt to build a fire that night. They managed to build a fire in the morning of 5 August and ate breakfast together before continuing their path.

== The deaths ==
According to Valentina Utochenko, the sole survivor, while descending down the mountain, at the altitude of 2,396 metres (7,861 ft), Krysin, who was at the back of the group, started screaming. He was bleeding from his eyes and ears and frothing at the mouth. He fell to the ground convulsing and then went still. Korovina ran up to him, trying to get him to gain consciousness. A moment later, she cried out, having the same symptoms as Krysin. She convulsed and then collapsed on top of Krysin. Filipenko, who had gotten to Korovina first, was the next to collapse, grabbing at her throat as though she couldn't breathe. She crawled over to a nearby rock and bashed her head against it until she went limp. Zalesova and Bapanov started to run. While running, they collapsed and died throwing up blood and clawing at their own throats, tearing their clothes off. Utochenko and Shvachkin hurried away, but shortly after Shvachkin also collapsed convulsing.

Utochenko ran down the mountain, set up a tent for the night under tree cover and fell asleep. On the next day, she returned to the site of her friends' death to retrieve supplies she needed from their bodies. For four days, she followed power lines down the mountain in hopes that someone would find her. She found a river and started following it. On 9 August, she was found by a group of Ukrainian kayakers, who took her to the nearest police station where a report was filed.

== Search and discovery ==
Utochenko did not speak for several days. The official search was conducted on 24 August, led by Yuri Golius. Because Utochenko had not been able to recount her version of events yet, it took two days to find the bodies using helicopters. The hikers' bodies were noted to have been partially undressed.

All of the dead hikers were found to have signs of bruised lungs. An autopsy, carried out in Ulan-Ude, concluded that Krysin, Filipenko, Bapanov, Zalesova and Shvachkin died of hypothermia, and Korovina had a heart attack. Protein deficiency due to malnutrition was listed as a contributing factor to their deaths.

== Theories ==
Multiple theories have been proposed to explain what caused the hikers' deaths. Rescuers Valery Tatarnikov and Vladimir Zinov, who took part in the search operation for the bodies, claimed that it was impossible that the hikers had died of cold. Zinov suggested that they might have died of altitude sickness. Tourist Vladimir Borzenkov and member of the search operation Nikolai Fedorov suggested that the hikers went mad due to infrasounds. Yuri Golius, the leader of the search operation, blamed their deaths on Korovina's negligence, claiming she was starving her students, which caused them to have vitamin deficiency. In a 2018 interview for Komsomolskaya Pravda, Utochenko denied the theory that Korovina might have been responsible for the deaths. She believes that the cause of the hikers' deaths was pulmonary edema.

=== Hypothermia ===
The first explanation proposes that the hikers died in the exact way the autopsy report concluded they died: by succumbing to hypothermia after not being properly sheltered that night. In severe hypothermia, there may be hallucinations and paradoxical undressing, in which a person removes their clothing, which would explain why the hikers were found partially undressed.

Certain parts of Utochenko's story could have been unintentionally exaggerated by her, due to the fact that people who undergo a traumatic experience often misremember details of it.

=== Military experiment ===
One theory suggests that the hikers might have stumbled upon a Russian military experiment conducted in the mountains; as such, they were killed so that the experiment would remain a secret. This theory was deemed uncredible due to the Khamar-Daban mountain range being a public area with many people traveling through it during tourist season, making it an unlikely place and time for conducting secret experiments.

=== Nerve agents ===
Symptoms described by Utochenko bear resemblance to death by nerve agents. In particular, the frothing at the mouth and convulsing match death by a strong nerve agent. The bruising of the lungs could also be a sign of death by nerve gas, as contact may cause respiratory distress. It can also cause cardiac arrest, matching Korovina's cause of death. However, not all of the symptoms correspond to the use of nerve agents. Utochenko claimed that those who died were bleeding from their eyes. Although nerve agents can cause irritation of the eyes and excessive eye-watering, bleeding from the eyes is not a clinically recognised symptom of nerve agents.

Novichok, a family of nerve agents developed by the Soviet Union and Russia up to 1993 and considered to be the deadliest nerve agents to exist, were reportedly tested in areas near Khamar-Daban.

=== Contaminated water ===
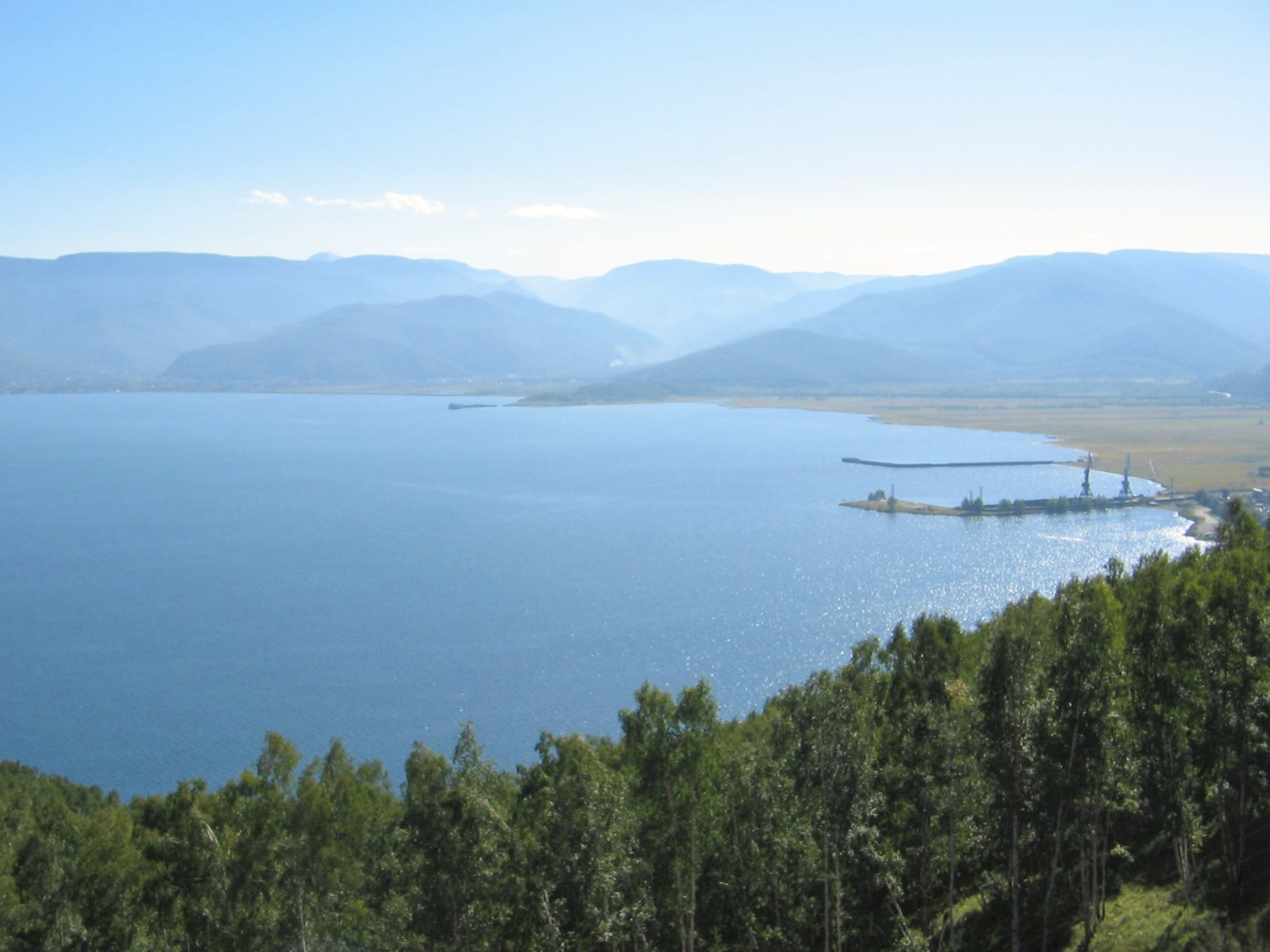
Lake Baikal

The nearby Lake Baikal is known to be a "toxic waste dumping ground". If the waste was washed downstream, the hikers might have drunk the toxins in their water. Some toxins might not have been visible in a standard toxicology report.

=== Mushroom poisoning ===
Another theory suggests that the hikers might have hallucinated and gotten sick due to mushroom poisoning. Korovina was known to be a forager and she taught the art to her students. One of the hikers might have accidentally added poisonous mushrooms to their breakfast. They could also have been hallucinogenic mushrooms. In very rare cases, an overdose of muscarine and ibotenic acid, most common in Amanita mushrooms, might cause psychosis, convulsions, cardiac arrest, and send a person into a coma. Amanita phalloides, the destroying angel, and death cap mushrooms can look similar to other edible mushrooms when they are not fully matured, such as young paddy straw and button mushrooms.

=== Consuming golden root (Rhodiola rosea) ===
The group were said to have been picking vast quantities of golden root which grew wild on the mountain. Some half-eaten roots were also found in their backpacks. The plant has often been used in traditional medicine. The plant is not considered toxic, but contains about 140 different chemical compounds, one of them being nitrate. Nitrate can have an effect of lowering blood pressure.

Consuming golden root has been generally considered safe, but some side effects have been reported, such as dizziness and headache. This does not fully account for the symptoms described, but it is also possible that the plants were in some way contaminated, or that the members of the group mistook another toxic plant species for golden root.

== See also ==
- Dyatlov Pass incident, an event in 1959 in which nine Soviet hikers died in the northern Ural Mountains under uncertain circumstances
- Chivruay Pass incident, a tragedy occurring in 1973, involving a group of explorers mysteriously dying in the Russian wilderness during the Soviet era
- Yuba County Five, known as the "American Dyatlov Pass", a 1978 incident in which five men mysteriously died or disappeared on their way back from a basketball game in Yuba County, California
- List of unsolved deaths
