= Dyatlov Pass incident =

1959 unsolved deaths in the Soviet Union

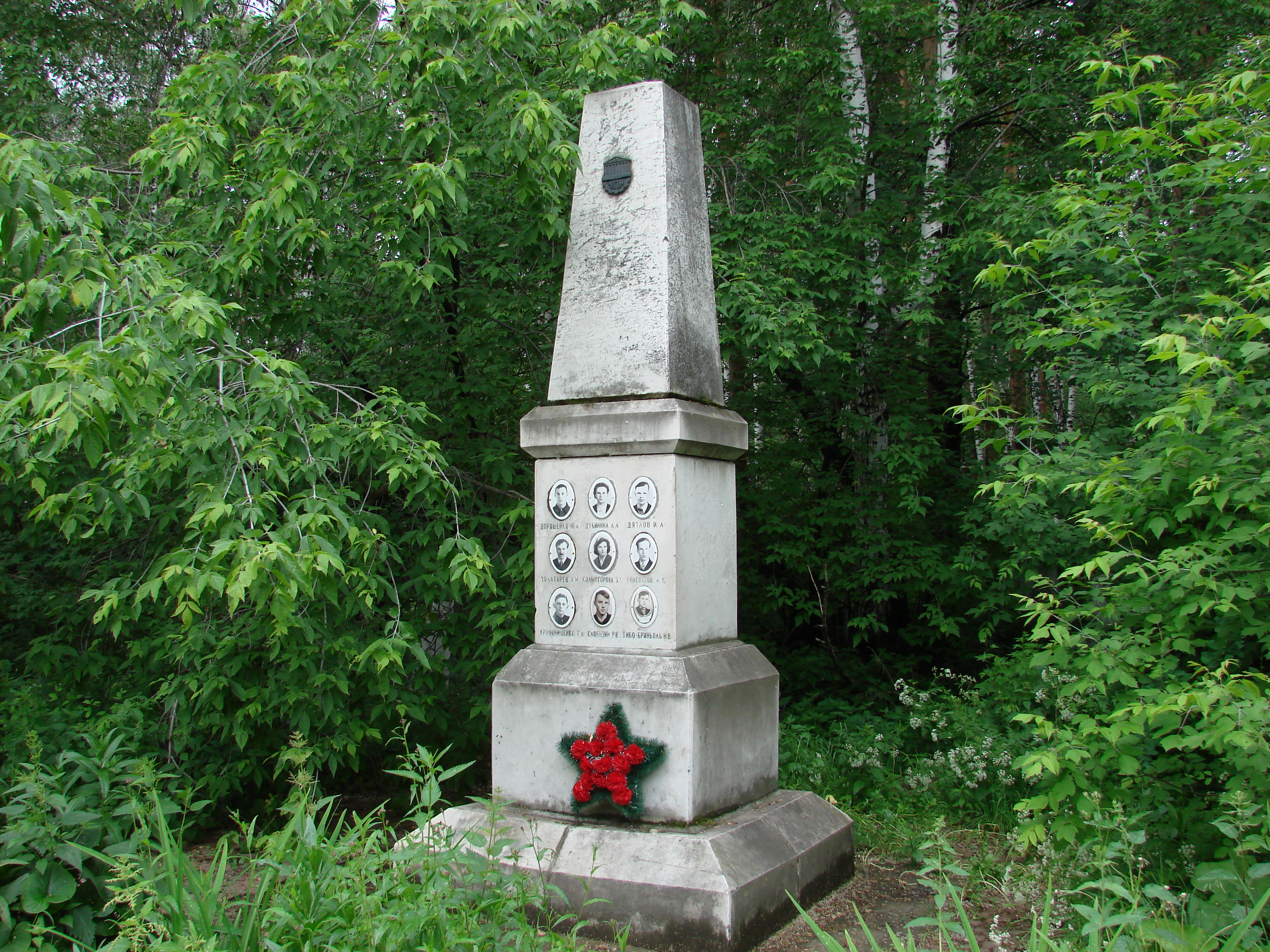
- The group's tomb at the Mikhailovskoe Cemetery in Yekaterinburg, Russia, in 2012
- Native name: Гибель тургруппы Дятлова
- Date: 1–2 February 1959
- Location: Kholat Syakhl, Northern Urals, Russian SFSR, Soviet Union; 61°45′16″N 59°26′42″E
- Type: Hiking accident
- Cause: Disputed
- Outcome: Area closed for 3 years
- Deaths: 9 trekkers from the Ural Polytechnical Institute: 6 due to hypothermia; 2 due to physical chest trauma; 1 due to a fractured skull

The Dyatlov Pass incident (Russian: Гибель тургруппы Дятлова, romanized: Gibel turgruppy Dyatlova, lit. 'Death of the Dyatlov Hiking Group') was an event in which nine Soviet ski hikers died in the northern part of the Ural Mountains ridge in the Russian SFSR on 1 or 2 February 1959 under undetermined circumstances. The experienced trekking group from the Ural Polytechnical Institute embarked on a difficult hike led by Igor Dyatlov, and had established a camp on the eastern slopes of Kholat Syakhl mountain. Overnight, the group cut their way out of their tent with knives and fled the campsite, inadequately dressed for the heavy snowfall, strong winds and extreme cold temperatures as low as −40 °C (−40 °F).

After the group's bodies were discovered, an investigation by Soviet authorities determined that six of them had died from hypothermia while the other three had been killed by physical trauma. One victim had major skull damage, two had severe chest trauma, and another had a small crack in his skull. Four of the bodies were found in May 1959 lying in running water in a creek, and three of them had damaged soft tissue of the head and face – two of the bodies were missing eyes, one its tongue, and one its eyebrows. The investigation concluded that a "compelling natural force" (elemental force) had caused the deaths. Numerous theories have been put forward to account for the unexplained deaths, including animal attacks, an avalanche or loud slab avalanche to their tent, appearance of a UFO or ball lightning, katabatic winds, infrasound-induced panic, conflict with local ethnic groups or fugitive criminals, a botched spy meeting with representatives of the Western bloc, military rocket and nuclear-testing involvement, or some combination of these factors.

The Russian government reopened an investigation into the incident in 2019, concluding in 2020 that an avalanche had most likely forced survivors to suddenly leave their camp in low-visibility conditions with inadequate clothing before ultimately dying of hypothermia. Andrey Kuryakov, deputy head of the regional prosecutor's office, stated that "It was a heroic struggle. There was no panic, but they had no chance to save themselves under the circumstances." A study led by scientists from EPFL and ETH Zürich, published in 2021, suggested that a type of avalanche known as a slab avalanche could explain some of the injuries.

A mountain pass in the area later was named "Dyatlov Pass" in memory of the group, despite the incident occurring about 1,700 m (5,600 ft) away on the eastern slope of Kholat Syakhl. A prominent rock outcrop in the area now serves as a memorial to the group. It is about 500 m (1,600 ft) to the east-southeast of the actual site of the final camp.

== Background ==
In 1959, a group was formed for a skiing expedition across the northern Urals in Sverdlovsk Oblast, Soviet Union. According to Prosecutor Tempalov, documents found in the tent of the expedition suggest the expedition was named for the 21st Congress of the Communist Party of the Soviet Union (CPSU), and possibly was dispatched by the local Komsomol organization. Igor Dyatlov, a 23-year-old radio engineering student at the Ural Polytechnical Institute (now Ural Federal University), the leader, assembled a group of nine others for the trip, most of whom were fellow students and peers at the university. The initial group consisted of eight men and two women, but one member later returned because of health issues. Each member of the group was an experienced Grade II-hiker with ski tour experience and would be receiving Grade III certification upon their return.

At the time, Grade III was the highest certification available in the Soviet Union and required candidates to traverse 300 km (190 mi). The route was designed by Dyatlov's group to reach the far northern regions of the Sverdlovsk Oblast and the upper streams of the Lozva river. The Sverdlovsk city route commission approved the route. This was a division of the Sverdlovsk Committee of Physical Culture and Sport, and they confirmed the group of 10 people 8 January 1959. The goal of the expedition was to reach Otorten (Отортен), a mountain 10 km (6 mi) north of the site where the incident occurred. This route, estimated as Category III, was undertaken in February, the most difficult time to traverse.

On 23 January 1959, the Dyatlov group was issued their route book, which listed their course following the No.5 trail. At that time, the Sverdlovsk City Committee of Physical Culture and Sport listed approval for 11 people. The 11th person listed was Semyon Zolotaryov, who had been certified to go with another expedition of similar difficulty (the Sogrin expedition group). The Dyatlov group left Sverdlovsk city (today Yekaterinburg) on the same day they received the route book.

Members of the expedition
Name (Romanization)	Name in Cyrillic script	Birthdate	Age, Sex	Cause of death	Location found	Ref.
Igor Alekseyevich Dyatlov	Игорь Алексеевич Дятлов	13 January 1936	23, ♂	Hypothermia	mountain slope	
Yuri Nikolayevich Doroshenko	Юрий Николаевич Дорошенко	29 January 1938	21, ♂	Hypothermia	pine tree	
Lyudmila Alexandrovna Dubinina	Людмила Александровна Дубинина	12 May 1938	20, ♀	Internal bleeding from severe chest trauma	stream	
Georgiy ('Yuri') (Note: Krivonishenko's first name was Georgiy, but he was called "Yura" by his friends) Alexeyevich Krivonishenko	Георгий (Юрий) Алексеевич Кривонищенко	7 February 1935	23, ♂	Hypothermia	pine tree	
Alexander Sergeyevich Kolevatov	Александр Сергеевич Колеватов	16 November 1934	24, ♂	Hypothermia	stream	
Zinaida Alekseyevna Kolmogorova	Зинаида Алексеевна Колмогорова	12 January 1937	22, ♀	Hypothermia	mountain slope	
Rustem Vladimirovich Slobodin	Рустем Владимирович Слободин	11 January 1936	23, ♂	Hypothermia	mountain slope	
Nikolai Vladimirovich Thibeaux-Brignolles	Николай Владимирович Тибо-Бриньоль	5 July 1935	23, ♂	Fatal skull injury	stream	
Semyon ('Alexander') (Note: Zolotaryov's first name was Semyon, but for unknown reasons, he asked to be called "Sasha," a Russian short for the name Alexander and therefore he's referred to in most memoirs, documents and studies as Alexander. (McCloskey 2013, Ch. "The Dyatlov group and Mount Otorten")) Alekseyevich Zolotaryov	Семён (Александр) Алексеевич Золотарёв	1 February 1921	38, ♂	Severe chest trauma	stream	
Yuri Yefimovich Yudin	Юрий Ефимович Юдин	19 July 1937	21, ♂	Left expedition 28 January because of illness; died 27 April 2013, aged 75	—	

== Expedition ==
Dyatlov Pass incident (Russia)
Nearby area

The group arrived by train at Ivdel (Ивдель), a town at the center of the northern province of Sverdlovsk Oblast in the early morning of 25 January 1959. The day after on 26 January, they took a lorry to Vizhai (Вижай), a village that is the last inhabited settlement to the north.

The next day on 27 January they began their trek towards Gora Otorten. On 28 January one member, Yuri Yudin, who had several health ailments (including rheumatism and a congenital heart defect), turned back because of knee and joint pain that made him unable to continue the hike. The remaining nine hikers continued the trek toward Gora Otorten by following the valley and river.

Diaries and cameras found around their last campsite made it possible to track the group's route up to the day preceding the incident. On 31 January the group arrived at the edge of a highland area and began to prepare for climbing. In a wooded valley, they cached surplus food and equipment that would be used for the trip back. The next day, the hikers started to move through the pass. It seems they planned to get over the pass and make camp for the next night on the opposite side, but because of worsening weather conditions – snowstorms and decreasing visibility – they lost their direction and deviated west, toward the top of Kholat Syakhl. When they realized their mistake, the group decided to set up camp there on the slope of the mountain, rather than move 1.5 km (1 mi) downhill to a forested area that would have offered some shelter from the weather. Yudin speculated, "Dyatlov probably did not want to lose the altitude they had gained, or he decided to practice camping on the mountain slope."

== Search and discovery ==
Before leaving, Dyatlov had agreed he would send a telegram to their sports club as soon as the group returned to Vizhai. It was expected this would happen no later than 12 February, but Dyatlov had told Yudin, before he departed from the group, he expected it to be longer. When the 12th passed and no messages had been received, there was no immediate reaction. Delays of a few days were common with such expeditions. On 20 February, the travellers' relatives demanded a rescue operation, and the head of the institute sent the first rescue groups, consisting of volunteer students and teachers. Later, the army and militsiya (police) forces became involved, with planes and helicopters ordered to join the operation.

On 26 February the searchers found the group's abandoned and badly damaged tent on Kholat Syakhl. The campsite baffled the search party. Mikhail Sharavin, the student who found the tent, said "the tent was half torn down and covered with snow. It was empty, and all the group's belongings and shoes had been left behind." Investigators said the tent had been cut open from inside. Nine sets of footprints, left by people wearing only socks, a single shoe or even barefoot, could be followed, leading down to the edge of a nearby wood on the opposite side of the pass, 1.5 km (1 mi) to the north-east. After 500 m (1,600 ft) these tracks were covered with snow. At the forest's edge, under a large Siberian pine, the searchers found the visible remains of a small fire. There were the first two bodies, those of Krivonishenko and Doroshenko, shoeless and dressed only in underwear. The branches on the tree were broken up to five metres high, suggesting that one of the hikers had climbed up to look for something, perhaps the camp. On the mountain slope between the pine and the camp, the searchers found three more corpses: Dyatlov, Kolmogorova, and Slobodin, who died in poses suggesting they were attempting to return to the tent. They were found at distances of 300, 630, and 480 m (980, 2,070, and 1,570 ft) from the tree.

Finding the remaining four travellers took more than two months. They finally were found on 4 May under 4 m (13 ft) of snow in a ravine 75 m (246 ft) further into the woods from the pine tree. Three of the four were better dressed than the others, and there were signs that some clothing of those who had died first had been removed for use by the others. Dubinina was wearing Krivonishenko's burned, torn trousers, and her left foot and shin were wrapped in a torn jacket.

== Investigation ==
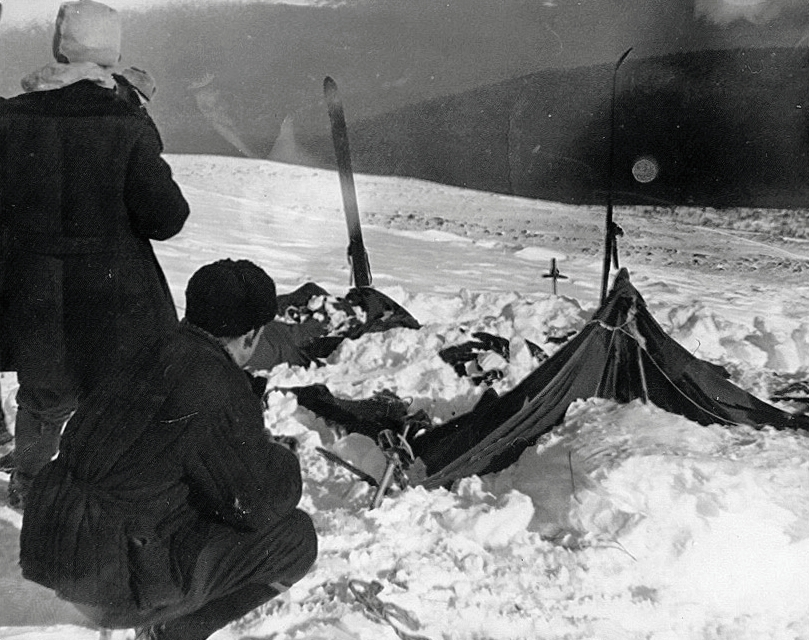
A view of the tent as the rescuers found it 26 February 1959. The tent had been cut open from the inside, and most of the hikers had fled in socks or barefoot.

A legal inquest started immediately after the first five bodies were found. A medical examination found no injuries that might have led to their deaths, and it was concluded that they had all died of hypothermia. Slobodin had a small crack in his skull, but it was not thought to be a fatal wound.

An examination of the four bodies found in May shifted the narrative of the incident. Three of the hikers had fatal injuries: Thibeaux-Brignolles had major skull damage, and Dubinina and Zolotaryov had major chest fractures. According to Boris Vozrozhdenny, the force required to cause such damage would have been extremely high, comparable to that of a car crash. Notably, the bodies had no external wounds associated with the bone fractures, as if they had been subjected to a high level of pressure.

All four bodies found at the bottom of the creek in a running stream of water had soft tissue damage to their head and face. For example, Dubinina was missing her tongue, eyes, part of the lips, as well as facial tissue and a fragment of skull bone, while Zolotaryov had his eyeballs missing, and Aleksander Kolevatov his eyebrows. V. A. Vozrozhdenny, the forensic expert performing the post-mortem examination, judged that these injuries happened post-mortem because of the location of the bodies in a stream.

Initial speculation suggested that the indigenous Mansi people, reindeer herders in the area, had attacked and killed the group for encroaching upon their lands. Several Mansi were interrogated, but the investigation indicated that the nature of the deaths did not support this hypothesis: only the hikers' footprints were visible, and they showed no sign of hand-to-hand struggle.

Although the temperature was low, about −25 to −30 °C (−13 to −22 °F) with a storm blowing, the dead were only partially dressed. Some had only one shoe, while others wore only socks.

Journalists reporting on the available parts of the inquest files claim that it states:

- Six of the group members died of hypothermia and three of fatal injuries.
- There were no indications of other people nearby on Kholat Syakhl apart from the nine travellers.
- The tent had been ripped open from within.
- The victims had died six to eight hours after their last meal.
- Traces from the camp showed that all group members left the campsite of their own accord, on foot.
- Some levels of radiation were found on one victim's clothing.
- To dispel the theory of an attack by the indigenous Mansi people, Vozrozhdenny stated that the fatal injuries of the three bodies could not have been caused by human beings, "because the force of the blows had been too strong and no soft tissue had been damaged".
- Released documents contained no information about the condition of the hikers' internal organs.

=== Related reports ===
- Yuri Kuntsevich, who was 12 years old at the time and who later became the head of the Yekaterinburg-based Dyatlov Foundation, attended five of the hikers' funerals. He recalled that their skin had a "deep brown tan". Skin colour ranging from brown to bright orange is characteristic of humans who die in extreme cold.
- Another group of hikers (about 50 km (30 mi) south of the incident) reported that they saw strange orange spheres in the sky to the north on the night of the incident. Similar spheres were observed in Ivdel and adjacent areas continually during the period from February to March 1959, by various independent witnesses (including the meteorology service and the military). These sightings were not noted in the 1959 investigation, and the various witnesses came forward years later.

=== Conclusions ===
At the time, the official conclusion was that group members had died because of a compelling natural force. The inquest officially ceased in May 1959 as a result of the absence of a guilty party. The files were sent to a secret archive.

In February 2019, Russian authorities reopened the investigation into the incident, although only three possible explanations were being considered: an avalanche, a slab avalanche, or a hurricane. The possibility of a murder had been discounted.

== Aftermath ==
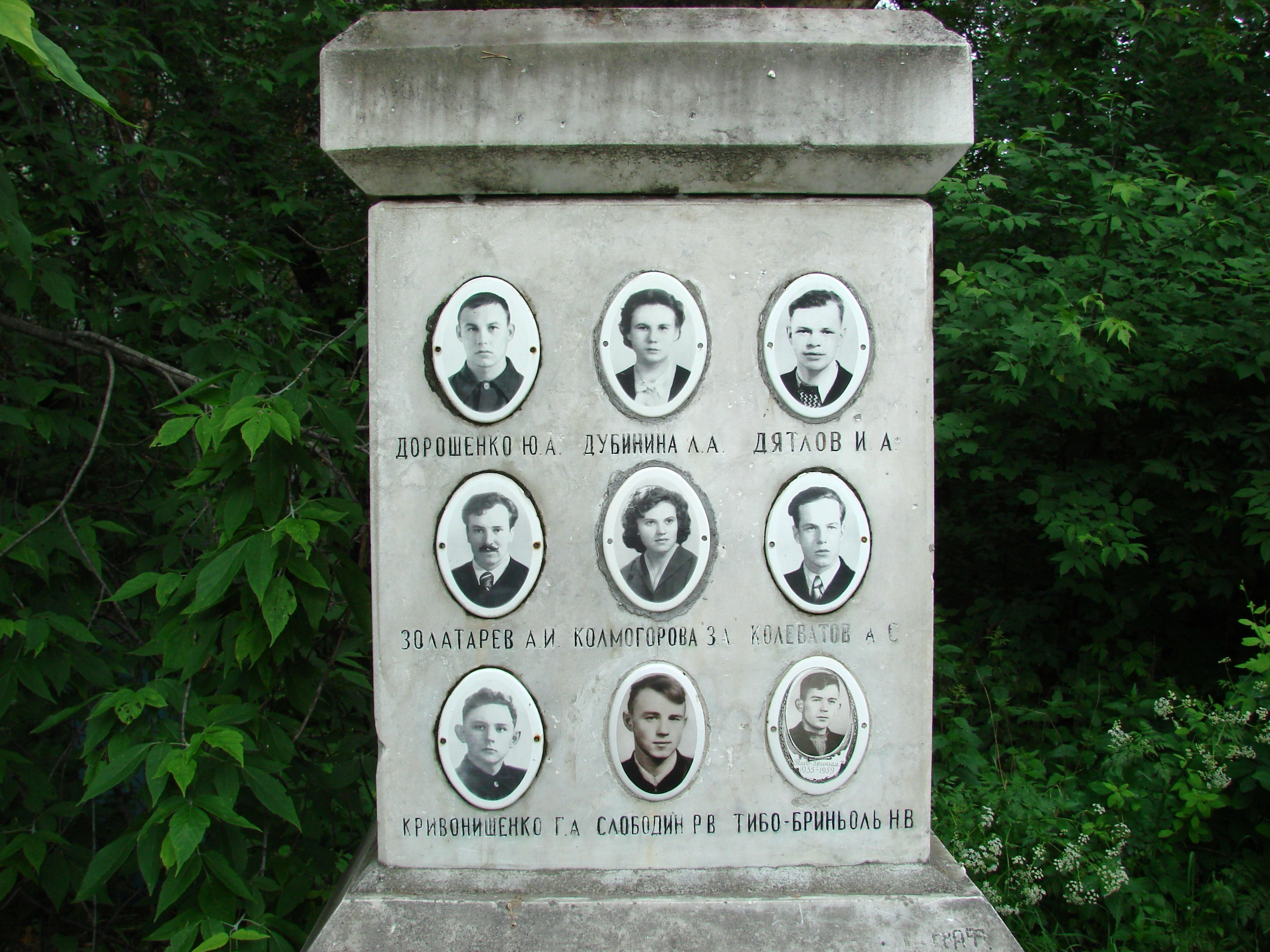
Tomb of the deceased at Mikhailovskoe Cemetery in Yekaterinburg, Russia

The Dyatlov Foundation was founded in 1999 at Yekaterinburg, with the help of Ural State Technical University, led by Yuri Kuntsevich (Юрий Кунцевич). The foundation's stated aim is to continue investigation of the case and to maintain the Dyatlov Museum to preserve the memory of the dead hikers.

In 1997, it was revealed that the negatives from Krivonishenko's camera were kept in the private archive of one of the investigators, Lev Nikitich Ivanov. The film material was donated by Ivanov's daughter to the Dyatlov Foundation. The diaries of the hiking party fell into Russia's public domain in 2009.

On 1 July 2016, a memorial plaque was inaugurated in Solikamsk in Ural's Perm Krai, dedicated to Yuri Yudin (the sole survivor of the expedition group), who died in 2013.

== Explanations and theories ==
=== Avalanche ===
==== ICRF's 1959 investigation review (2015–2019) ====
A review of the 1959 investigation's evidence completed 2015 to 2019 by experienced investigators from the Investigative Committee of the Russian Federation (ICRF) on request of the families confirmed the avalanche with several important details added. The ICRF investigators (one of them an experienced alpinist) confirmed that the weather on the night of the tragedy was harsh, with wind speeds up to hurricane force, 20–30 m/s (45–67 mph; 72–108 km/h), a snowstorm and temperatures reaching −40 °C (−40 °F). These factors were not considered by the 1959 investigators, who arrived at the scene of the accident three weeks later when the weather had much improved and any remains of the snow slide had settled and been covered with fresh snowfall. The harsh weather at the same time played a major role in the events of the night, which have been reconstructed as follows:

- On 1 February the group arrives at the Kholat Syakhl mountain and erects a large, nine-person tent on an open slope, without any natural barriers such as tree cover. The heavy snowfall of the preceding few days persisted, with strong wind and freezing conditions.
- The group traversing the slope and digging a tent site into the snow weakened the snow base. During the night, the snowfield above the tent started to slide down slowly under the weight of the new snow, gradually pushing on the tent fabric, starting from the entrance. The group wakes up and starts evacuation in panic, with only some able to put on warm clothes. With the entrance blocked, the group escapes through a hole cut in the tent fabric and descends the slope to find a spot more sheltered from the avalanche, 1500 m downslope below the timberline.
- Because some of the members have only incomplete clothing, the group splits. Two of the group, only in their underwear and pyjamas, were found at the Siberian pine tree, near a fire pit. Their bodies were found first and they were confirmed to have died from hypothermia.
- Three hikers, including Dyatlov, attempted to climb back to the tent, possibly to get sleeping bags. They had better clothes than those at the fire pit, though still quite light, and had inadequate footwear. Their bodies were found at various distances 300–600 m from the campfire, in poses suggesting they had fallen exhausted while trying to climb in deep snow in extremely cold weather.
- The remaining four, equipped with warm clothing and footwear, were trying to find or build a better camping place in the forest further down the slope. Their bodies were found two months later, 70 m from the fireplace, under several metres of snow and with traumas indicating that they had fallen into a snow hole formed above a stream.

According to the ICRF investigators, the factors contributing to the tragedy were extremely bad weather and lack of experience of the group leader in such conditions, which led to the selection of an unsuitable campsite. After the snow slide, another mistake of the group was to split up, rather than building a temporary camp down in the forest and trying to survive through the night. Negligence of the 1959 investigators contributed to their report creating more questions than answers, as well as inspiring numerous alternative and conspiracy theories.

==== Ural Federal District report (2020) ====
On 11 July 2020, Andrey Kuryakov, deputy head of the Ural Federal District directorate of the Prosecutor-General's Office, announced an avalanche as the "official cause of death" for the Dyatlov group in 1959.

The most appealing aspect of Kuryakov's scenario is that the Dyatlov party's actions no longer seem irrational. The snow slab, according to Greene, probably would have made loud cracks and rumbles as it fell across the tent, making an avalanche seem imminent. Kuryakov noted that although the skiers made an error in the placement of their tent, everything they did subsequently was textbook: They conducted an emergency evacuation to ground that would be safe from an avalanche, they took shelter in the woods, they started a fire, they dug a snow cave. Had they been less experienced, they might have remained near the tent, dug it out and survived. But avalanches are by far the biggest risk in the mountains in winter. The more experience you have, the more you fear them. The skiers' expertise doomed them.

— Douglas Preston, The New Yorker

==== Computer simulation of slab avalanche (2021) ====
In 2021, an independent team of physicists and engineers led by Swiss researchers Alexander Puzrin from ETH Zurich and Johan Gaume from EPFL published a computer simulation model and analysis in Communications Earth & Environment, that demonstrates how even a relatively small slide of snow slab caused by progressive wind-blown snow accumulation on the 28°-slope right above the hikers' tent could cause tent damage and injuries consistent with those suffered by the Dyatlov team.

==== Supporting theory ====
A version of the avalanche theory was given in 2015 as follows:

That the group woke up in a panic (...) and cut their way out the tent either because an avalanche had covered the entrance to their tent or because they were scared that an avalanche was imminent (...) (better to have a potentially repairable slit in a tent than risk being buried alive in it under tons of snow). They were poorly clothed because they had been sleeping, and ran to the safety of the nearby woods where trees would help slow oncoming snow. In the darkness of night, they got separated into two or three groups; one group made a fire (hence the burned hands) while the others tried to return to the tent to recover their clothing given that the danger had passed. But it was too cold, and they all froze to death before they could find their tent in the darkness. At some point, some of the clothes might have been recovered or swapped from the dead, but at any rate, the group of four whose bodies was most severely damaged were caught in an avalanche and buried under 4 metres (13 ft) of snow (more than enough to account for the 'compelling natural force' the medical examiner described). Dubinina's tongue probably was removed by scavengers and ordinary predation.

— US author Benjamin Radford's skeptic theory after reviewing a sensationalist "Yeti" hypothesis

==== Counter arguments ====
Arguments against an actual avalanche (and not the fear of an avalanche) include:

- The location of the incident did not have any obvious signs of an avalanche having occurred. An avalanche would have left certain patterns and debris distributed over a wide area. The bodies found within a month of the event were covered with a shallow layer of snow, and had there been an avalanche of sufficient strength to sweep away the second party, these bodies would have been swept away as well; this would have caused more serious and different injuries in the process and would have damaged the tree line.
- More than 100 expeditions to the region had been held since the incident, and none ever reported conditions that might create an avalanche. A study of the area using up-to-date terrain-related physics revealed that the location was entirely unlikely for such an avalanche. The "dangerous conditions" found in another nearby area (which had significantly steeper slopes and cornices) were observed in April and May when the snowfalls of winter were melting. During February, when the incident occurred, there were no such conditions.
- An analysis of the terrain and the slope showed that even if there could have been a very specific avalanche in the area, its path would have gone past the tent. The tent had collapsed from the side but not in a horizontal direction.
- Dyatlov was an experienced skier, and the much older Zolotaryov was studying for his master's certificate in ski instruction and mountain hiking. Neither of these two men would have been likely to camp anywhere in the path of a potential avalanche.
- Footprint patterns leading away from the tent were inconsistent with someone, let alone a group of nine people, running in panic from either real or imagined danger. All the footprints leading away from the tent and towards the woods were consistent with individuals walking at a normal pace.

=== Katabatic wind ===
In 2019, a Swedish–Russian expedition was made to the site, and investigators ultimately proposed that a violent katabatic wind was a plausible explanation for the incident. Katabatic winds are somewhat rare events and can be extremely violent. They were implicated in a 1978 case at Anaris Mountain in Sweden, where eight hikers were killed and one was severely injured. The topography of these locations was noted to be similar, according to the expedition.

A sudden katabatic wind would have made it impossible to remain in the tent, and the most rational course of action would have been for the hikers to cover the tent with snow and seek shelter behind the tree line. On top of the tent, a flashlight also was left turned on, maybe intentionally so the hikers could find their way back to the tent once the winds subsided. The expedition proposed that the group of hikers constructed two bivouac shelters, one of which collapsed, leaving four of the hikers buried with the severe injuries observed.

=== Infrasound hypothesis ===
Another hypothesis popularised by Donnie Eichar's 2013 book Dead Mountain is that wind going around Kholat Syakal created a Kármán vortex street, which can produce infrasound capable of inducing panic attacks in humans.

According to Eichar's theory, the infrasound generated by the wind as it passed over the top of the Holatchahl mountain was responsible for causing physical discomfort and mental distress in the hikers. Eichar claims that, because of their panic, the hikers were driven to leave the tent by whatever means necessary and fled down the slope. By the time they were farther down the hill, they would have been out of the infrasound's path and would have regained their composure, but in the darkness would have been unable to return to their shelter. The traumatic injuries suffered by three of the victims were the result of their stumbling over the edge of a ravine in the darkness and landing on rocks at the bottom.

=== Military tests ===
In one speculation, the campsite fell within the path of a Soviet parachute mine exercise. This theory alleges that the hikers, woken by loud explosions, fled the tent in a shoeless panic and found themselves unable to return for supply retrieval. After some members froze to death attempting to endure the bombardment, others commandeered their clothing only to be fatally injured by subsequent parachute mine concussions. There are indeed records of parachute mines being tested by the Soviet military in the area about the time the hikers were there. Parachute mines detonate while still in the air rather than upon striking the Earth's surface and produce signature injuries similar to those experienced by the hikers: heavy internal damage with relatively little external trauma. The theory coincides with reported sightings of glowing, orange orbs floating or falling in the sky within the general vicinity of the hikers and allegedly photographed by them, potentially military aircraft or descending parachute mines. This theory (among others) uses scavenging animals to explain Dubinina's injuries. Some speculate that the bodies were unnaturally manipulated, on the basis of characteristic livor mortis markings discovered during an autopsy, as well as burns to hair and skin. Photographs of the tent allegedly show it was erected incorrectly, something the experienced hikers were unlikely to have done.

A similar theory alleges the testing of radiological weapons and is based partly on the discovery of radioactivity on some of the clothing as well as the descriptions of the bodies by relatives as having orange skin and grey hair. However, radioactive dispersal would have affected all, not only some, of the hikers and equipment, and the skin and hair discolouration can be explained by a natural process of mummification after three months of exposure to the cold and wind. The initial suppression by Soviet authorities of files describing the group's disappearance sometimes is mentioned as evidence of a cover-up; but the concealment of information about domestic incidents was standard procedure in the USSR, and thus far from peculiar. By the late 1980s, all Dyatlov files had been released in some manner.

Researcher Andrei Shepelev hypothesized the hikers fled for shelter after mistaking a photoflash bomb from an US RB-47 reconnaissance aircraft for a nuclear explosion.

=== Paradoxical undressing ===
International Science Times posited that the hikers' deaths were caused by hypothermia, which can induce a behaviour known as paradoxical undressing in which hypothermic subjects remove their clothes in response to perceived feelings of burning warmth. It is undisputed that six of the nine hikers died of hypothermia. However, others in the group appear to have acquired additional clothing (from those who had already died), which suggests that they were of a sound enough mind to try to add layers.

=== Other explanations ===
==== Keith McCloskey documentary ====
Keith McCloskey, who has researched the incident for many years and has appeared in several TV documentaries on the subject, travelled to the Dyatlov Pass in 2015 with Yuri Kuntsevich of the Dyatlov Foundation and a group. At the Dyatlov Pass he noted:

- There were wide discrepancies in distances quoted between the two possible locations of the snow shelter where Dubinina, Kolevatov, Zolotaryov and Thibeaux-Brignolles were found. One location was about 80 to 100 metres from the pine tree where the bodies of Doroshenko and Krivonishenko were found and the other suggested location was so close to the tree that anyone in the snow shelter could have spoken to those at the tree without raising their voices to be heard. This second location also has a rock in the stream where Dubinina's body was found and is the more likely location of the two. However, the second suggested location of the two has a topography that is closer to the photos taken at the time of the search in 1959.
- The location of the tent near the ridge was found to be too close to the spur of the ridge for any significant buildup of snow to cause an avalanche. Furthermore, the prevailing wind blowing over the ridge blew snow away from the edge of the ridge on the side where the tent was. This further reduced any buildup of snow to cause an avalanche. This aspect of the lack of snow on the top and near the top of the ridge was pointed out by Sergey Sogrin in 2010.
- Lev Ivanov's boss, Evgeny Okishev (Deputy Head of the Investigative Department of the Sverdlovsk Oblast Prosecution Office), still was alive in 2015 and had given an interview to former Kemerovo prosecutor Leonid Proshkin in which Okishev stated that he was arranging another trip to the Pass to fully investigate the strange deaths of the last four bodies when Deputy Prosecutor General Urakov arrived from Moscow and ordered the case shut down.
- Evgeny Okishev also stated in his interview with Leonid Proshkin that Klinov, head of the Sverdlovsk Prosecutor's Office, was present at the first post-mortems in the morgue and spent three days there, something Okishev regarded as highly unusual and the only time, in his experience, it happened.

==== Donnie Eichar documentary ====
Donnie Eichar, who investigated and made a documentary about the incident, evaluated several other theories that are deemed unlikely or have been discredited:

- They were attacked by the native Mansi people or other local tribesmen.
  The local tribesmen were known to be peaceful, and there was no track evidence of anyone approaching the tent.
- They were attacked and chased by animal wildlife.
  There were no animal tracks, and the group likely would not have abandoned the relative security of the tent.
- High winds blew one member away, and the others had attempted to rescue the person.
  A large, experienced group would not have behaved like that, and winds strong enough to blow away people with such force would have also blown away the tent.
- An argument, possibly related to a romantic encounter that left some of them only partially clothed, led to a violent dispute.
  Eichar states that this is "highly implausible. By all indications, the group was largely harmonious, and sexual tension was confined to platonic flirtation and crushes. There were no drugs present and the only alcohol was a small flask of medicinal alcohol, found intact at the scene. The group had even sworn off cigarettes for the expedition." Furthermore, a fight could not have left the massive injuries that one body had suffered.

== Popular media ==
Anatoly Gushchin (Анатолий Гущин) summarized his research in the book The Price of State Secrets Is Nine Lives (Цена гостайны – девять жизней in 1990. Some researchers criticized the work for its concentration on the speculative theory of a Soviet secret weapon experiment, but its publication led to public discussion, stimulated by interest in the paranormal. Indeed, many of those who had remained silent for thirty years reported new facts about the accident. One of them was the former police officer, Lev Nikitich Ivanov (Лев Никитич Иванов), who led the official inquest in 1959. In 1990, he published an article that included his admission that the investigation team had no rational explanation for the incident. He also stated that, after his team reported that they had seen flying spheres, he then received direct orders from high-ranking regional officials to dismiss this claim.

In 2000, a regional television company produced the documentary film The Mystery of Dyatlov Pass (Тайна перевала Дятлова). With the help of the film crew, a Yekaterinburg writer, Anna Matveyeva (Анна Матвеева), published a docudrama novella of the same name. A large part of the book includes broad quotations from the official case, diaries of victims, interviews with searchers and other documentaries collected by the filmmakers. The narrative line of the book details the everyday life and thoughts of a modern woman (an alter ego of the author herself) who attempts to resolve the case. Despite its fictional narrative, Matveyeva's book remains the largest source of documentary materials ever made available to the public regarding the incident. Also, the pages of the case files and other documentaries (in photocopies and transcripts) are gradually being published on a web forum for enthusiastic researchers.

The incident inspired multiple types of popular media productions, such as the 2013 horror film Devil's Pass, the 2015 horror video game Kholat, and the 2026 Australian crime drama The Killings at Parrish Station.

== See also ==
- Chivruay Pass incident, a lesser known incident occurring in 1973, also involving a group of explorers mysteriously dying in the Russian wilderness during the Soviet era
- Khamar-Daban incident, a lesser known 1993 incident also involving a group of explorers mysteriously dying in the Russian wilderness
- Yuba County Five, known as the "US Dyatlov Pass", a 1978 incident in which five men mysteriously died or disappeared on their way back from a basketball game in Yuba County, California

== Works cited ==
- Eichar, Donnie (2013). Dead Mountain: The Untold True Story of the Dyatlov Pass Incident. San Francisco, US: Chronicle Books. ISBN 978-1-4521-2956-3.
- McCloskey, Keith (2013). Mountain of the Dead: The Dyatlov Pass Incident. The History Press. ISBN 978-0-7524-9148-6.
- McCloskey, Keith (2020). Journey to Dyatlov Pass: An Explanation of the Mystery 2nd Edition. CreateSpace. ISBN 979-86-5779267-6.
