= Kholat Syakhl =

Mountain in Russia

Coordinates: 61°45′18″N 59°25′21″E

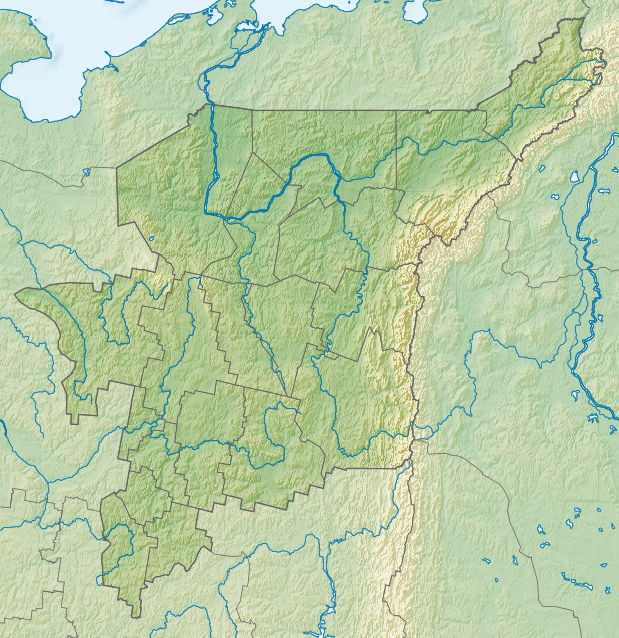
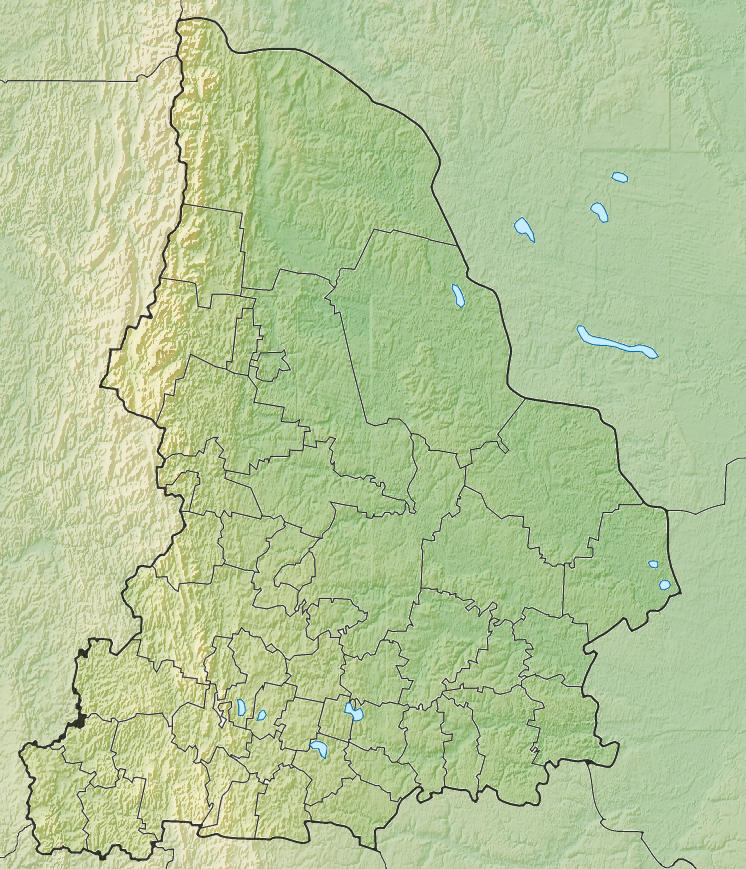
- Location within Komi Republic Location within Sverdlovsk Oblast Location within European Russia

Highest point
- Elevation: 1,096.7 m (3,598 ft)

Naming
- Native name: Холатчахль (Russian)
- English translation: Silent Mountain

Geography
- Location: Komi Republic and Sverdlovsk Oblast, Russia
- Parent range: Ural Mountains

Kholat Syakhl, a transliteration of Mansi Holatchahl meaning "dead mountain" or "silent peak", is a mountain in the northern Ural region of Russia, on the border between the Komi Republic and Sverdlovsk Oblast near the northeast corner of Perm Krai.

On February 2, 1959, a group of ski hikers led by Igor Dyatlov mysteriously perished on the east shoulder of Kyolat Syakhl (not Otorten, as is sometimes erroneously reported). This Dyatlov Pass incident is the main reason that people outside the immediate area in Russia have heard of this remote peak.

== Nomenclature ==
The name of this mountain simply meant a "lack of game" for native Mansi hunters. The word kholat (meaning "death") is a relatively common placename element within Mansi territory, and it is a part of at least 3 other local geographic names.

In Russian, the Mansi name can be translated as myórtvaya vershína (мёртвая вершина), literally "dead peak".

== Historic references ==
In documents related to the investigation into the Dyatlov Pass ski-hikers, Kholat Syakhl is often referred to as "height 1079" — its height on topographic maps issued before 1963. On more modern maps, however, the height of the mountain is indicated as 1,096.7 metres (3,598 ft) above sea level.
