= Mass fraction =

Mass fraction may refer to:

- Mass fraction (chemistry), it is the ratio of mass of a constituent to the total mass of the mixture
  - Fuel mass fraction
- Propellant mass fraction (aerospace), the amount of mass left behind such as the stages of rockets
- Payload fraction (aerospace), the ratio of the mass to be transported compared to the total mass of the vehicle, including fuel

== See also ==
- Mass ratio (disambiguation)
