= Military helicopter =

Helicopter which is built or converted for use by military forces

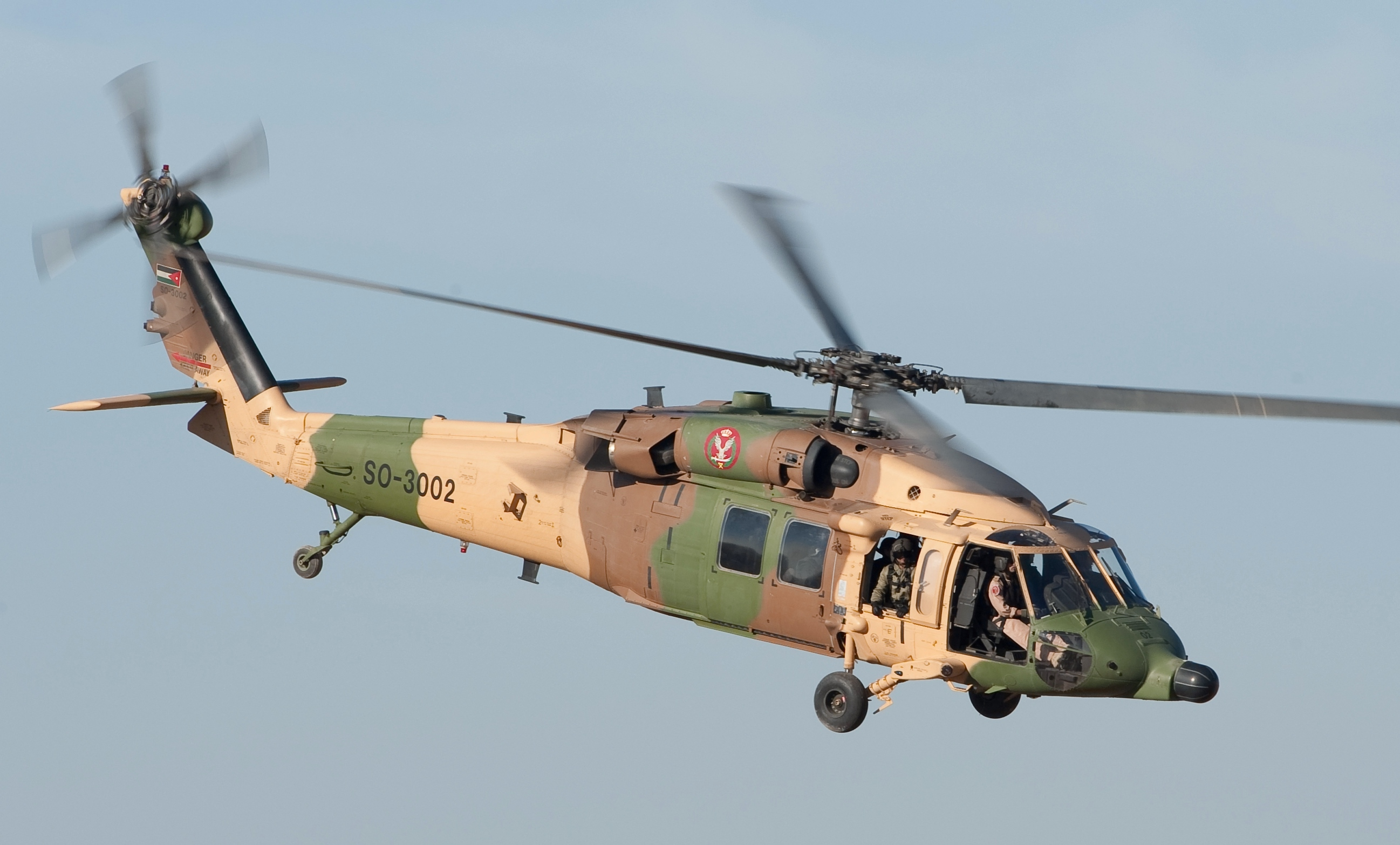
A UH-60 Black Hawk operated by the Royal Jordanian Air Force

A military helicopter is a helicopter that is either specifically designed for or converted for usage by a military. A military helicopter's mission is a function of its design or conversion. The most common use of military helicopters is airlift, but transport helicopters can be modified or converted to perform other missions such as combat search and rescue (CSAR), medical evacuation (MEDEVAC), serving as an airborne command post, or even armed with weapons for close air support. Specialized military helicopters are intended to conduct specific missions. Examples of specialized military helicopters are attack helicopters, observation helicopters and anti-submarine warfare (ASW) helicopters.

== Types and roles ==
Military helicopters play an integral part in the sea, land and air operations of modern military forces. Generally manufacturers will develop airframes in different weight/size classes which can be adapted to different roles through the installation of mission specific equipment. To minimise development costs the basic airframes can be stretched and shortened, be updated with new engines and electronics and have the entire mechanical and flight systems mated to new fuselages to create new aircraft. For example, the Bell UH-1 Iroquois (known as the "Huey") has given rise to a number of derivatives through stretching and re-engining, including the Bell AH-1.

Modern helicopters have introduced modular systems which allow the same airframe to be configured for different roles, for example the Augusta Westland AW101 "Merlin" in Royal Navy service can be rapidly configured for ASW or transport missions in hours. To at the same time retain flexibility and limit costs, it is possible to fit an airframe for but not with a system, for example in the US Army's Boeing AH-64D Apache variants are all fitted to be able to take the Longbow radar system, but not enough sets have been bought to equip the whole force. The systems can be fitted to only those airframes that need it, or when finances allow the purchase of enough units.

=== Equipment ===
Most military helicopters are armoured to some extent; however, all equipment is limited to the installed power and lift capability and the limits installed equipment places on useful payload. The most extensive armour is placed around the pilots, engines, transmission, and fuel tanks. Fuel lines, control cables and power to the tail rotor may also be shrouded by Kevlar armour. The most heavily armoured helicopters are attack, assault and special forces helicopters. In transport helicopters the crew compartment may or may not be fully armoured, a compromise being to give the passengers Kevlar lined seats but to leave the compartment for the most part unarmoured. Survivability is enhanced by redundancy and the placement of components to protect each other. For example, the Blackhawk family of helicopters uses two engines and can continue to fly on only one (under certain conditions), the engines are separated by the transmission and placed so that if attacked from any one flank, the engine on that flank acts to protect the transmission and the engine on the other side from damage.

Aviation electronics, or avionics, such as communication radios and navigation aids are common on most military helicopters. Specialized avionics, such as electronic countermeasures and identification friend or foe systems, are military specific systems that can also be installed on military helicopters. Other payload or mission systems are installed either permanently or temporarily, based on specific mission requirements; optical and IR cameras for scout helicopters, dunking sonar and search radar for anti-submarine helicopters, extra radio transceivers and computers for helicopters used as airborne command posts.

Armour, fire suppression, dynamic and electronics systems enhancements are invisible to casual inspection; as a cost-cutting measure some nations and services have been tempted to use what are essentially commercial helicopters for military purposes. For example, it has been reported that China is carrying out a rapid enlargement of its assault helicopter regiments with the civilian version of the Russian Mil Mi-17. These helicopters without armour and electronic counter measures will function well enough for training exercises and photo opportunities but would be suicidal to deploy in the assault role in actual combat situations. The intention of China appears to be to retrofit these helicopters with locally produced electronics and armour when possible, freeing available funds to allow rapid creation of enough regiments to equip each of its Group Armies, allowing a widespread buildup of experience in helicopter operations.

=== Attack ===
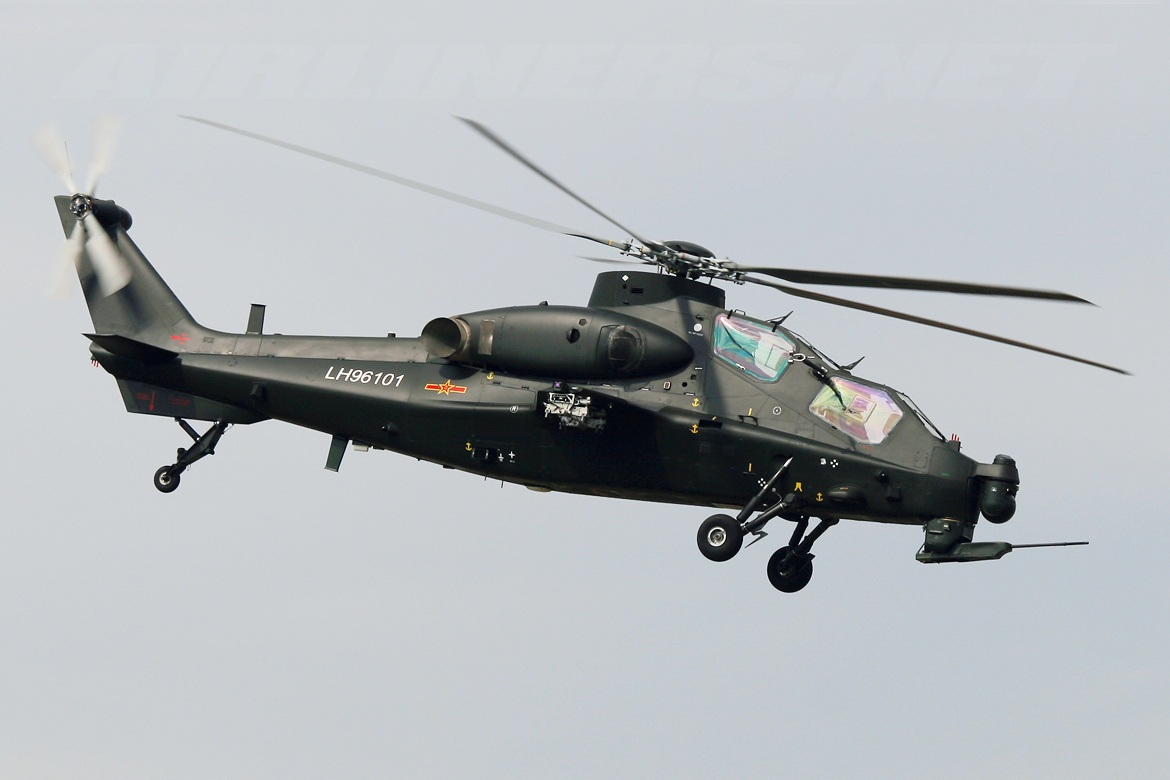
A Z-10 of the People's Liberation Army Ground Aviation

Attack helicopters are helicopters used in the anti-tank and close air support roles. The first of the modern attack helicopters was the Vietnam era Bell AH-1 Cobra, which pioneered the now classic format of pilot and weapons officer seated in tandem in a narrow fuselage, chin mounted guns, and rockets and missiles mounted on stub wings. To enable them to find and identify their targets, some modern attack helicopters are equipped with very capable sensors such as a millimeter wave radar system.

=== Transport ===
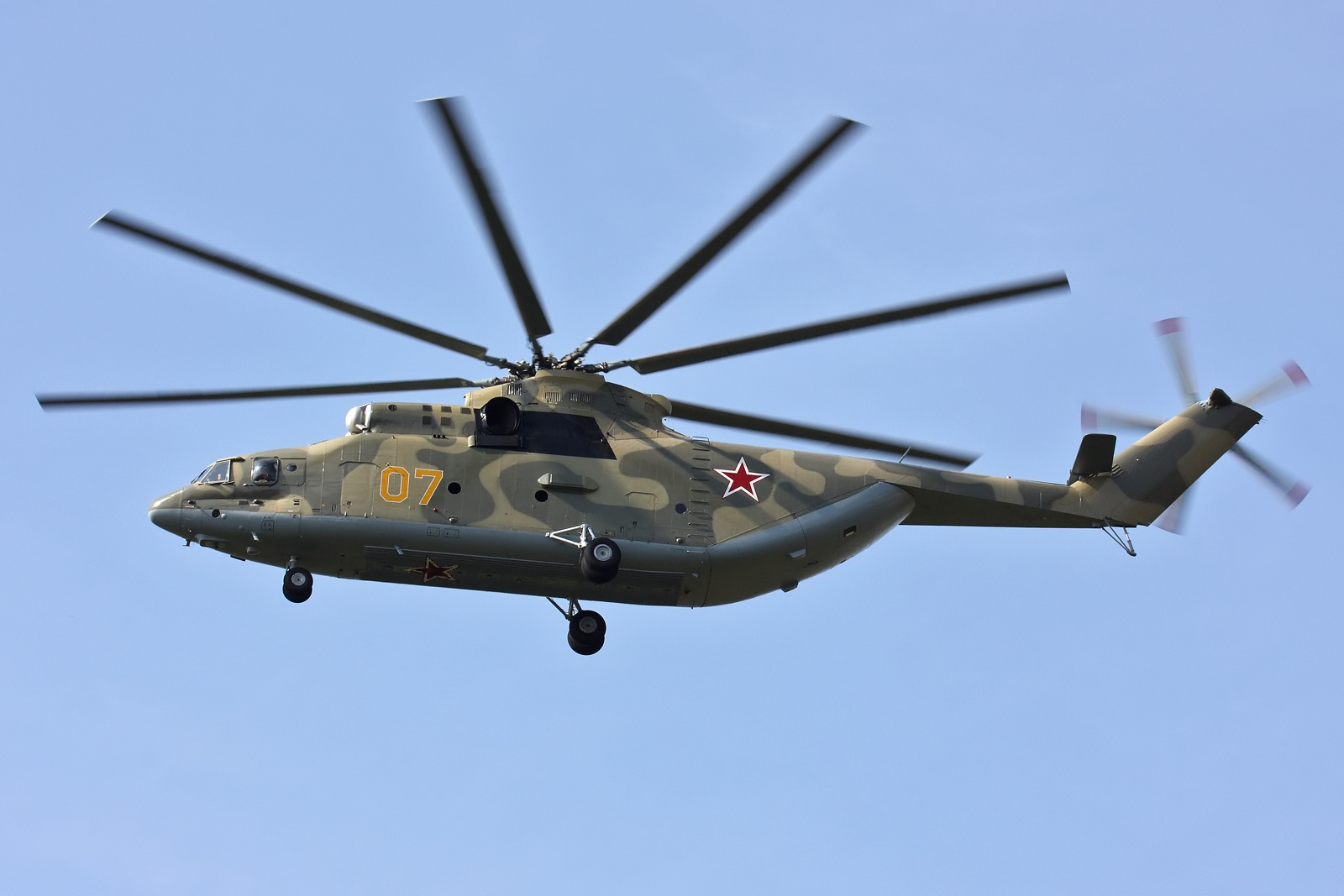
An Mi-26 operated by the Russian Air Force

Transport helicopters are used for transporting personnel (troops) and cargo in support of military operations. In larger militaries, these helicopters are often purpose-built for military operations, but commercially available aircraft are also used. The benefit of using helicopters for these operations is that personnel and cargo can be moved to and from locations without requiring a runway for takeoffs and landings. Cargo is carried either internally, or externally by slung load where the load is suspended from an attachment point underneath the aircraft. Personnel are primarily loaded and unloaded while the helicopter is on the ground. However, when the terrain restricts even helicopters from landing, personnel may also be picked up and dropped off using specialized devices, such as rescue hoists or special rope lines, while the aircraft hovers overhead.

Air assault is a military strategy that relies heavily on the use of transport helicopters. An air assault involves a customized assault force that is assembled on the pick-up zone and staged for sequential transport to a landing zone (LZ). The idea is to use the helicopters to transport and land a large number of troops and equipment in a relatively short amount of time, in order to assault and overwhelm an objective near the LZ. The advantage of air assault over an airborne assault is the ability of the helicopters to continually resupply the force during the operation, as well as to transport the personnel and equipment to their previous location, or a follow-on location if the mission dictates.

=== Observation ===
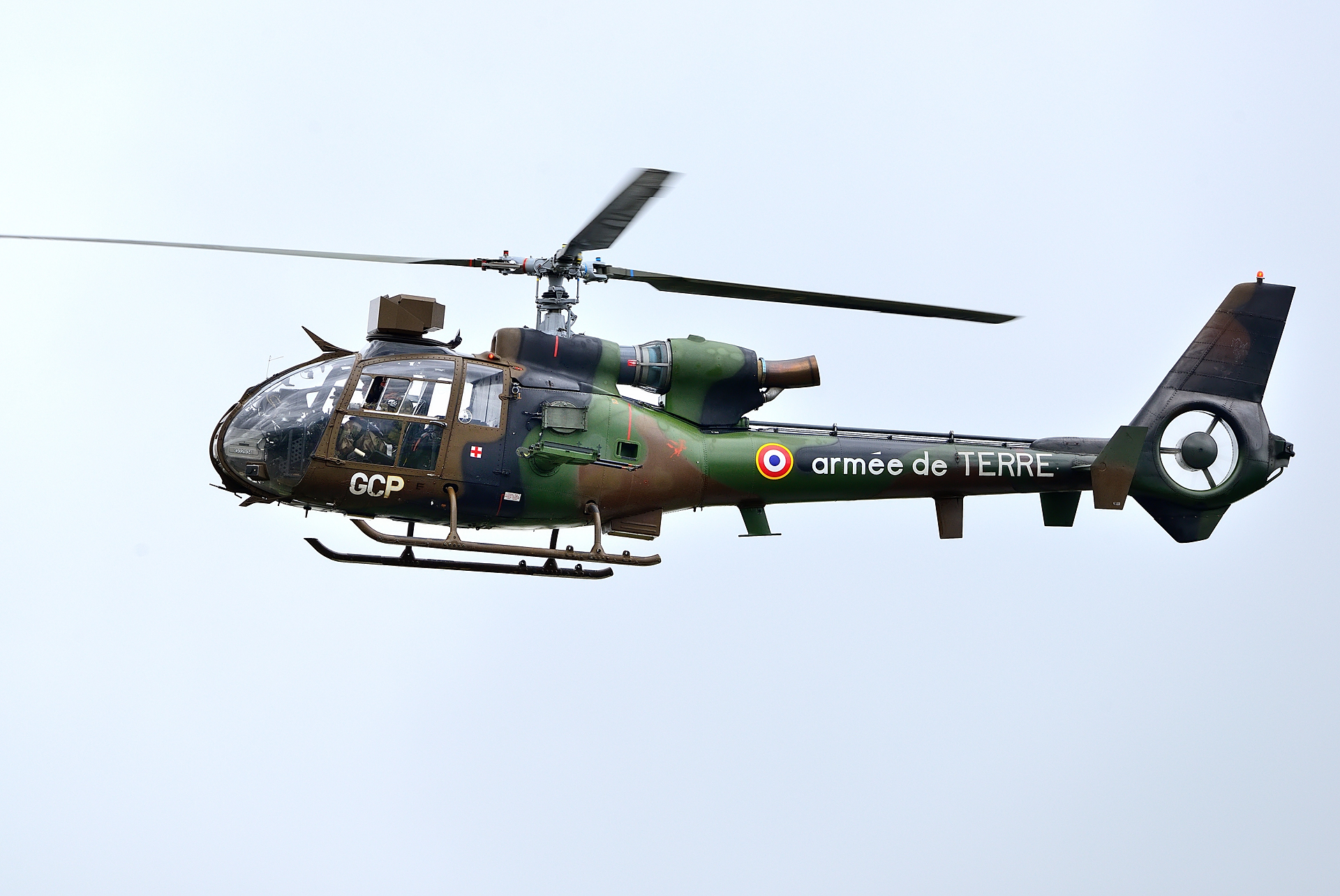
An Aérospatiale Gazelle operated by the French Army Light Aviation

The first reconnaissance and observation aircraft were balloons, followed by light airplanes, such as the Taylorcraft L-2 and Fieseler Fi 156. As the first military helicopters became available, their ability to both maneuver and to remain in one location made them ideal for reconnaissance. Initially observation helicopters were limited to visual observation by the aircrew, and most helicopters featured rounded, well-glazed cockpits for maximum visibility. Over time, the human eye became supplemented by optical sensor systems. Today, these include low light level television and forward looking infrared cameras. Often, these are mounted in a stabilised mount along with multi-function lasers capable of acting as laser rangefinder and targeting designators for weapons systems.

By nature of the mission, the observation helicopter's primary weapons are its sensor suite and communications equipment. Early observation helicopters were effective at calling for artillery fire and airstrikes. With modern sensor suites, they are also able to provide terminal guidance to anti-tank guided weapons, laser-guided bombs and other missiles and munitions fired by other armed aircraft. Observation helicopters may also be armed with combinations of gun and rocket pods and sometimes anti-tank guided missiles or air-to-air missiles, but in smaller quantities than larger attack helicopters. Primarily, these weapons were intended for the counter-reconnaissance fight—to eliminate an enemy's reconnaissance assets—but they can also be used to provide limited direct fire support or close air support.

=== Maritime ===
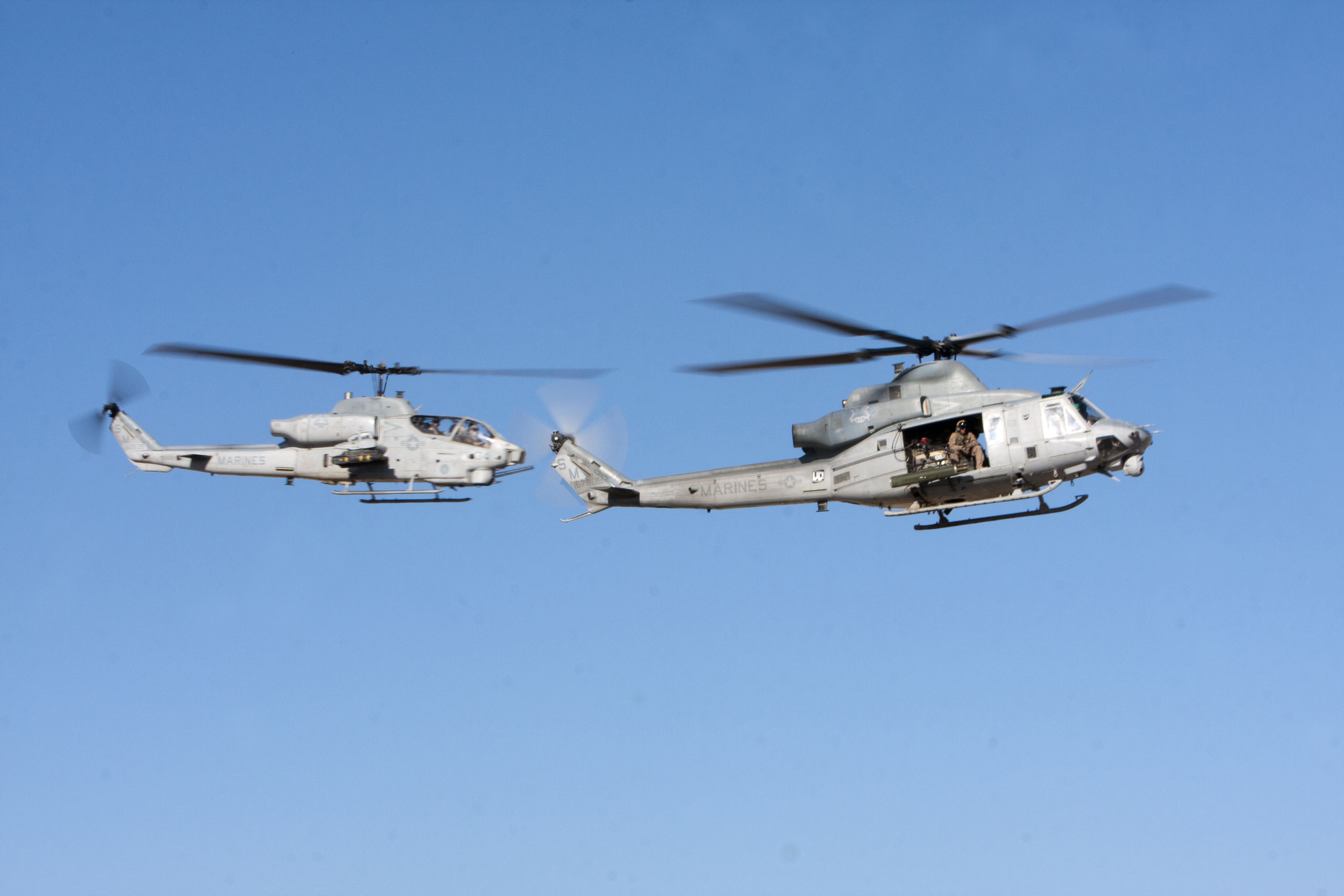
An AH-1 SuperCobra (left) and UH-1Y Venom (right) operated by the United States Marine Corps

Among the first practical uses of helicopters when the Sikorsky R-4 and R-5 became available to British and American forces was deployment from navy cruisers and battleships, at first supplementing and later replacing catapult-launched observation aircraft. Another niche within the capability of the early helicopters was as plane guard - tasked with the recovery of pilots who had ditched near an aircraft carrier.

As helicopter technology matured with increased payload and endurance, anti-submarine warfare (ASW) was added to the helicopter's repertoire. Initially, helicopters operated as weapons delivery systems, attacking with air-launched torpedoes and depth charges based on information provided by its parent and other warships. In the 1960s, the development of the turboshaft engine and transistor technology changed the face of maritime helicopter aviation. The turboshaft engine allowed smaller helicopters, such as the Westland Wasp, to operate from smaller vessels than their reciprocating engine predecessors. The introduction of transistors allowed helicopters, such as the Sikorsky SH-3 Sea King, to be equipped with integral dunking sonar, radar and magnetic anomaly detection equipment. The result was an aircraft able to more quickly respond to submarine threats to the fleet without waiting for directions from fleet vessels.

Today, maritime helicopters such as the Sikorksy SH-60 Seahawk and the Westland Lynx are designed to be operated from frigates, destroyers and similar size vessels. The desire to carry and operate two helicopters from frigate- and destroyer-sized vessels has affected the maximum size of the helicopters and the minimum size of the ships. Increasing miniaturisation of electronics, better engines and modern weapons now allow even the modern, destroyer-based, multi-role helicopter to operate nearly autonomously in the ASW, anti-shipping, transport, SAR and reconnaissance roles.

Medium- and large-sized helicopters are operated from carriers and land bases. In the British, Spanish, and Italian navies, the larger helicopters form the main anti-submarine strength of carrier air wings. When operating from shore bases, the helicopters are used as anti-submarine pickets to protect against hostile submarines loitering outside military ports and harbours; their endurance and payload providing advantages over smaller helicopters.

Soviet maritime helicopters, operating from its cruisers, had the additional role of guidance of the cruisers' long range anti-shipping missiles.

Maritime helicopters are navalised aircraft for operation from ships. This includes enhanced protection against salt water corrosion, protection against ingestion of water, and provision for forced ditching at sea.

=== Multi-mission and rescue ===
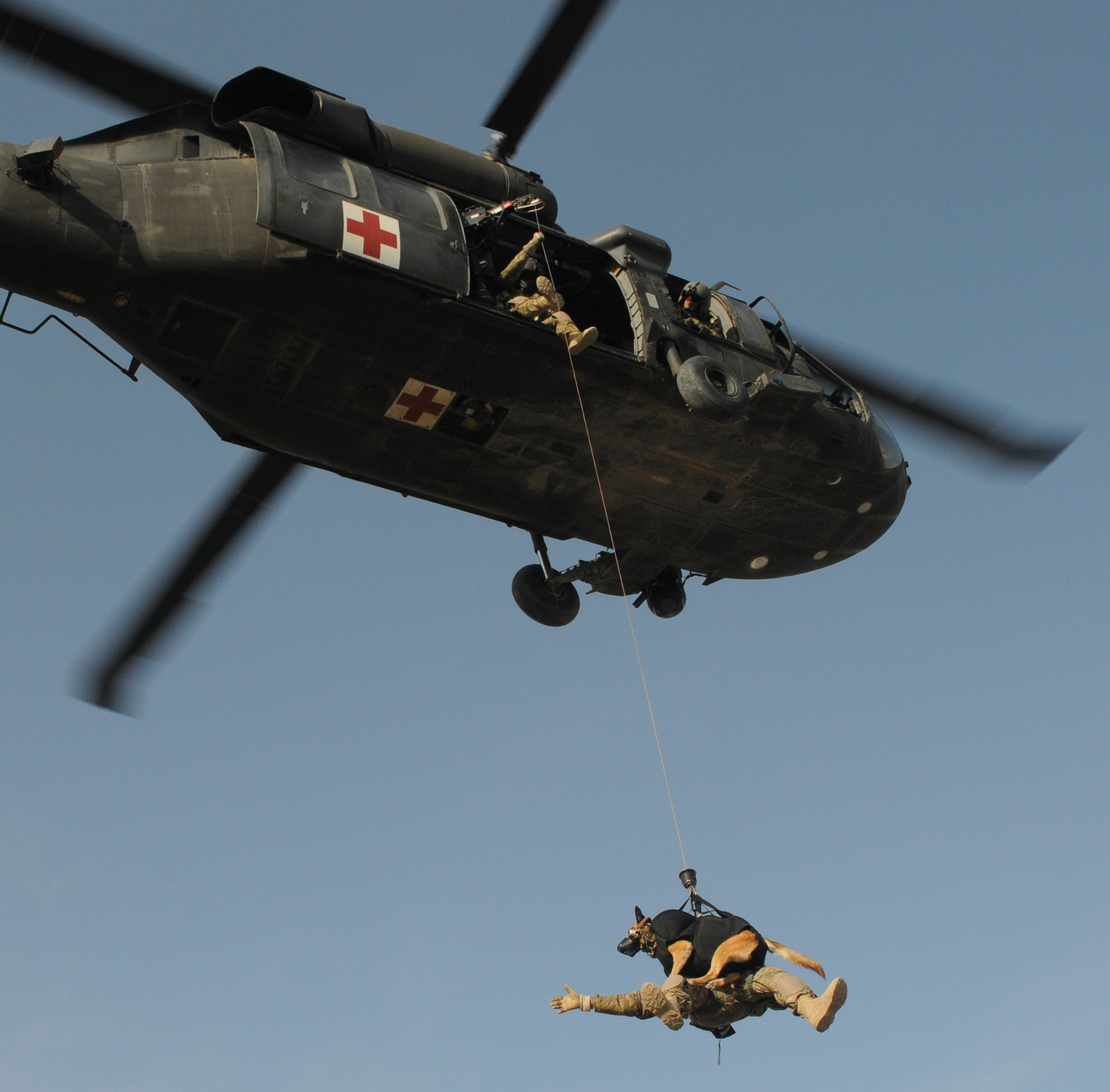
A flight medic and a military dog being lifted into a rescue-equipped UH-60 Black Hawk

As helicopters came into military service, they were quickly pressed into service for search and rescue (Note: Search and rescue is sometimes referred to as SAR. Search and rescue during combat is referred to by NATO countries as CSAR and is a specialized personnel recovery mission.) and medical evacuation. During World War II, Flettner Fl 282s were used in Germany for reconnaissance, and Sikorsky R-4s were used by the United States to rescue downed aircrews and injured personnel in remote areas of the China Burma India Theater, from April 1944 until the war's end. The use of helicopters for rescue during combat increased during the Korean War and the Algerian War. In the Vietnam War the USAF acquired Sikorsky S-61R (Jolly Green Giant) and Sikorsky CH-53 Sea Stallion (Super Jolly Green Giant) helicopters for the Combat search and rescue (CSAR) mission.

=== Training ===
Some services use a version of their operational helicopters, usually in the light class, for pilot training. For example, the British have used the Aérospatiale Gazelle both in operations and as a trainer. Some services also have an ab initio phase in training that uses very basic helicopters. The Mexican Navy has acquired a number of the commercially available Robinson R22 and R44 helicopters for this purpose.

=== Utility ===
A utility helicopter is a multi-purpose helicopter. A utility military helicopter can fill roles such as ground attack, air assault, military logistics, medical evacuation, command and control, and troop transport.

== Tactics and operations ==
While not essential to combat operations, helicopters give a substantial advantage to their operators by being a force multiplier. To maximise their impact, helicopters are utilised in a combined arms approach.

=== High intensity warfare ===
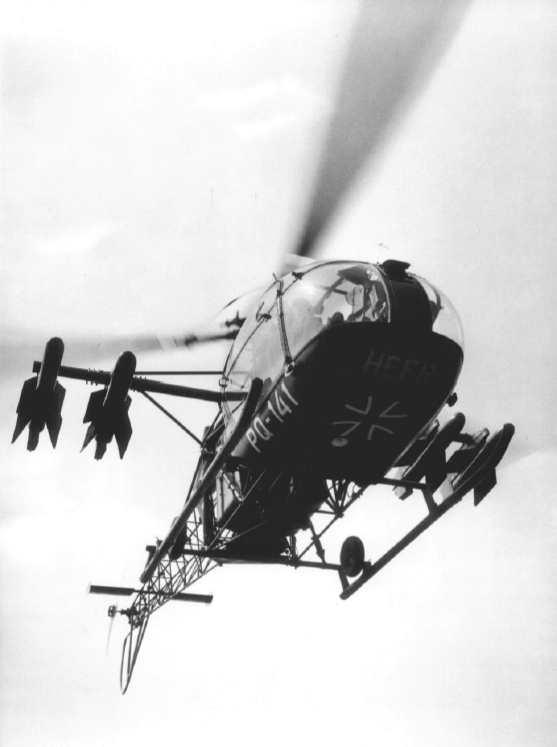
An Aérospatiale Alouette II anti-tank helicopter of the German Army armed with SS.10 missiles

High-intensity warfare is characterized by large arrays of conventional armed forces, including mass formations of tanks, with significant air defenses. Helicopter armament and tactics were changed to account for a less-permissive flight environment. Anti-tank missiles, such as the SS.11 and the Aérospatiale SS.12/AS.12 were developed and mounted on French military helicopters. In turn, the United States adapted its BGM-71 TOW for firing from helicopters and eventually developed the AGM-114 Hellfire. Meanwhile, the Soviet Union adapted the 3M11 Falanga missile for firing from the Mil Mi-24.

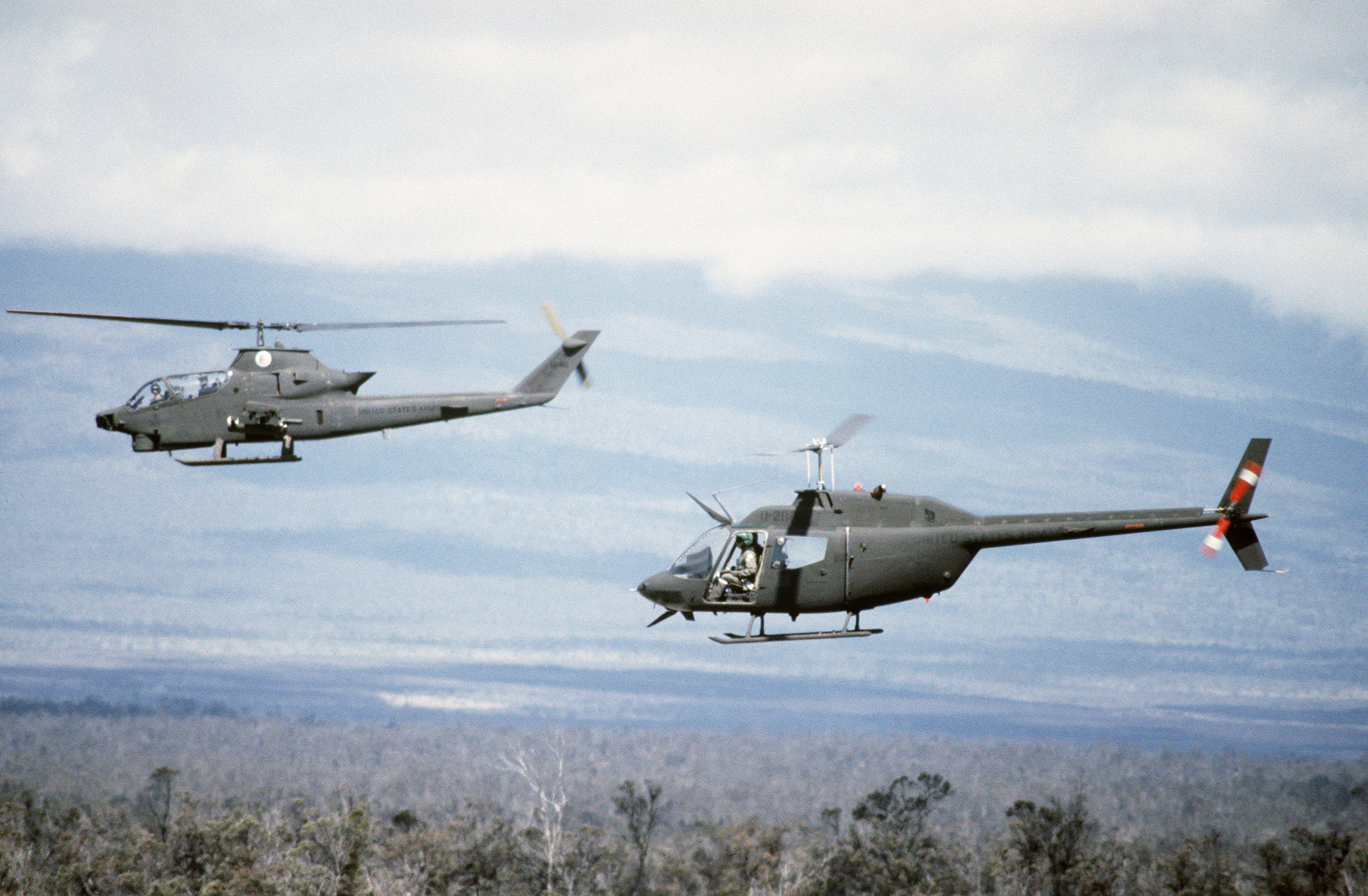
An OH-58 and an AH-1 of the Hawaii Air National Guard. Such a combination would have formed hunter-killer team during the Cold War.

In the air, attack helicopters armed with anti-tank missiles, and one or more unarmed, or lightly armed scout helicopters operate in concert. The scout helicopter, flying at low level in a nap-of-the-earth approach, attempts to both locate the enemy armoured columns and to map out approaches and ambush positions for the attack helicopters. Late-model scout helicopters include laser designators to guide missiles fired from the attack helicopters. After finding a target, the scout helicopter can locate it and then direct the attack helicopter's missile where to fire. The attack helicopters have only to rise from cover briefly to fire their missiles before returning to a concealed location. Late-development of attack helicopters, such as the Mil Mi-28N, the Kamov Ka-52, and the AH-64D Longbow, incorporate sensors and command and control systems to relieve the requirement for scout helicopters.

To enhance the combat endurance of these missile-armed helicopters, transport helicopters were used to carry technicians, reloads and fuel to forward locations. Establishing these forward arming and refuel points (FARP) at pre-arranged locations and times allowed armed or attack helicopters to re-arm and refuel, often with their engines running and the rotors still turning, and to quickly return to the front lines.

=== Low intensity warfare ===
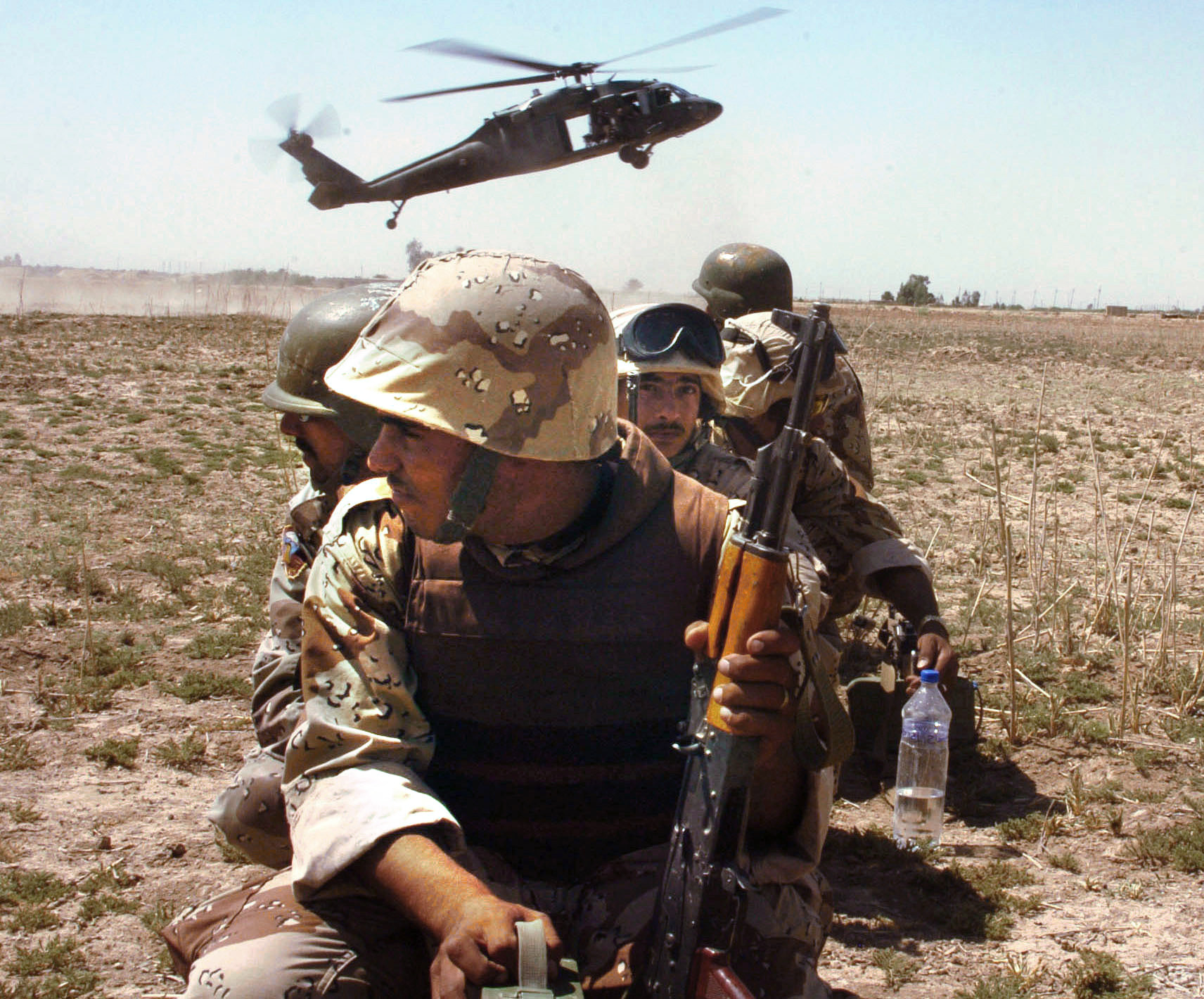
An Iraqi Armed Forces unit prepares to board a UH-60 Black Hawk for a COIN operation

In counter-insurgency (COIN) warfare, the government force establishes its presence in permanent or temporary military bases from which to mount patrols and convoys. The government forces seek to deter the insurgent forces from operating, and to capture or kill those that do. The operation of forces from fixed bases linked by a fixed network of roads becomes a weakness. Emplaced insurgents and local sympathisers may observe such facilities covertly and gather intelligence on the schedules and routes of patrols and convoys. With this intelligence the insurgents can time their operations to avoid the COIN forces or plan ambushes to engage them, depending on their own tactical situation.

Helicopters return a measure of surprise and tactical flexibility to the COIN commander. Patrols need not start and end in the same place (the main entrance of the local compound), nor do supply convoys need follow the same roads and highways. During the Rhodesian Bush War, the Rhodesian military developed and refined "Fireforce" tactics, using small flights of light helicopters, the helicopters would be equipped as gunships to directly attack insurgents with aerial gunfire and also as either an airborne command/observation post or troop transport. Once contact had been established against enemy guerillas paratroopers would be dropped by a Dakota and act as "beaters" to drive the guerillas into stop groups landed by the helicopters.

During the Troubles, the Provisional Irish Republican Army (IRA) became adept at avoiding conventional, fixed roadblocks and patrols. To prevent predictable patterns, the patrols were deployed by helicopter, known as Eagle Patrols, and were then able to disrupt the IRA's ability to move personnel and arms. In the aftermath of the American invasion of Iraq helicopters have been used as aerial supply trucks and troop transports to prevent exposure to ambushes set by the Iraqi insurgency.

Due to the cost and complexity of training and support requirements, insurgent forces rarely have access to helicopters.

== Manufacturers ==
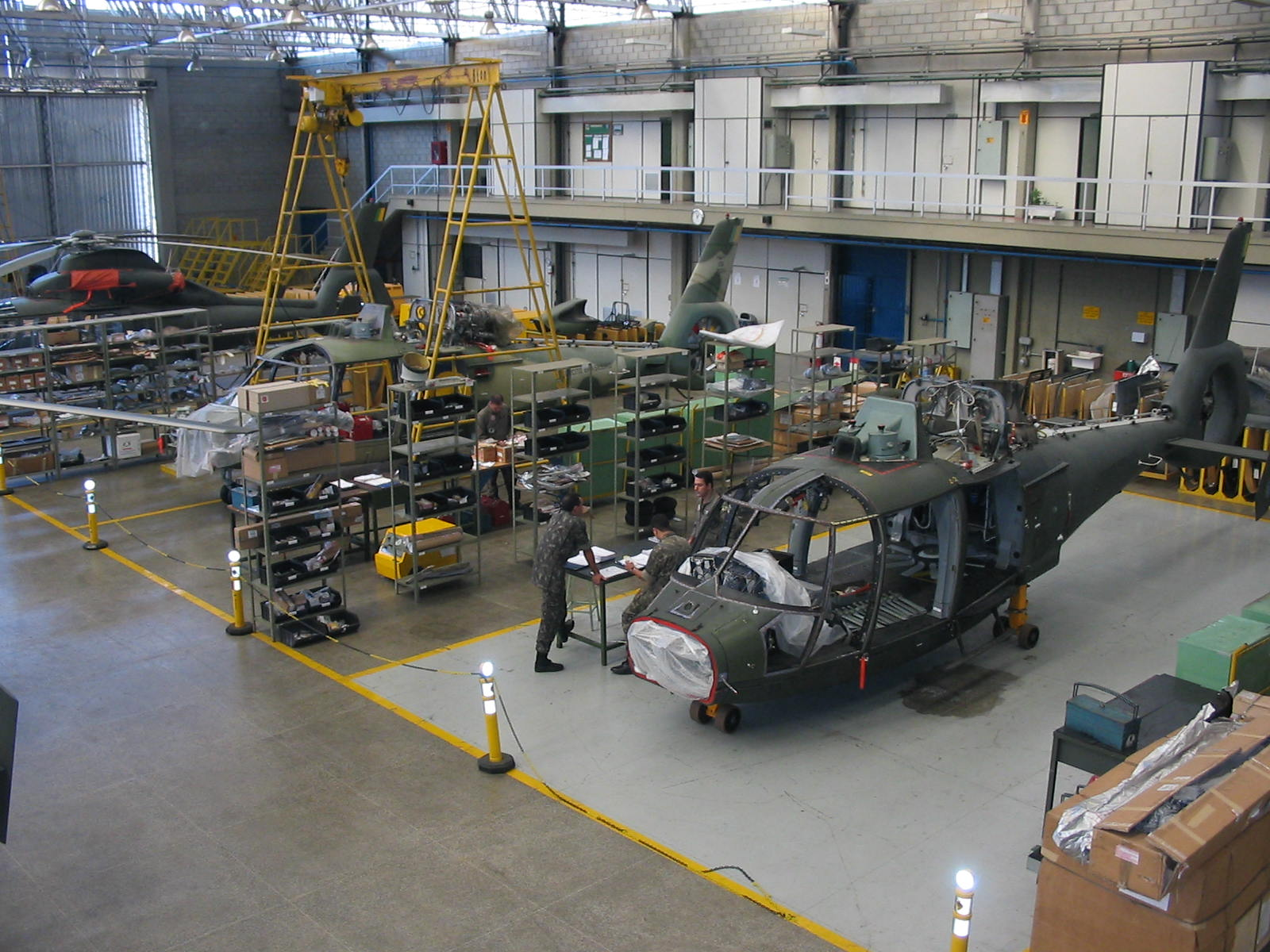
Helibras HM-1 Pantera airframes being assembled in Brazil

The major Western European helicopter manufacturers are Leonardo S.p.A. (formerly AgustaWestland) and Eurocopter Group. In North America, the three primary manufacturers are Boeing (Boeing Vertol and McDonnell Douglas), Bell Helicopter and Sikorsky Aircraft.

In Japan, the three main manufacturers of helicopters are the aviation arms of the Japanese conglomerates Mitsubishi, Kawasaki and Fuji Heavy Industries. These companies initially followed a business model based on forming strategic partnerships with foreign, usually American, companies with the licensed production of those companies products, whilst building up their own ability to design and manufacture helicopters through a process of workshare and technology transfer. In India, Hindustan Aeronautics Limited is the main helicopter manufacturer for the Indian Armed Forces.

In the Soviet planned economic system, the Mil and Kamov OKBs were responsible only for the design of helicopters. A re-organisation of the helicopter industry in Russia created Russian Helicopters, a holding company to bring together Mil, Kamov, and other helicopter manufacturing and maintenance plants.

== See also ==
- Army aviation
- Helicopter bombing
