= Loiter (aeronautics) =

Flying for a long time over some small region

In aeronautics and aviation, loiter is prolonged flight over a small region.

In general aviation, the loiter phase of a flight generally occurs at the end, when the plane is flying in circles over a region (i.e. holding) while waiting for air traffic control to signal clearance for final approach and landing.

In military aviation operations such as aerial reconnaissance or close air support, loitering is when the aircraft repeatedly fly over or around a zone of interest in order to maintain surveillance or to perform strafing/air strike upon ground targets. Cruise is the time period the aircraft travels to the target and returns after the loiter.

In astronautics, the loiter phase of spacecraft used for human spaceflight may be as long as six months, as is the case for Soyuz spacecraft which remain docked while expedition crew members reside aboard the International Space Station.

== Endurance ==
The endurance of the aircraft during the loiter phase is often calculated using the Breguet formula:

$$E = \frac{1}{C} \frac{L}{D} \ln \left( \frac{W_i}{W_f} \right)$$

where:

- $E \,\!$ is the endurance (dimensions of time)
- $C \,\!$ is the specific fuel consumption (dimensions of 1/time)
- $L \,\!$ is the total lift force on the aircraft
- $D \,\!$ is the total drag force on the aircraft
- $W_i \,\!$ is the weight of the aircraft at the start of the phase
- $W_f \,\!$ is the weight of the aircraft at the end of the phase

== See also ==
- Endurance (aeronautics)
- Heathrow arrival stacks, holding patterns in the United Kingdom
- Flight planning
- Holding
