= Flight length =

Distance of a flight

In aviation, the flight length or flight distance refers to the distance of a flight. Aircraft do not necessarily follow the great-circle distance, but may opt for a longer route due to weather, traffic, the use of jet streams, or to refuel.

Commercial flights are often categorized into long-, medium- or short-haul by commercial airlines based on flight length, although there is no international standard definition.

The related term flight time is defined by ICAO as "The total time from the moment an aeroplane first moves for the purpose of taking off until the moment it finally comes to rest at the end of the flight", and is referred to colloquially as "blocks to blocks" or "chocks to chocks" time. In commercial aviation, this means the time from pushing back at the departure gate to arriving at the destination gate. Flight time is measured in hours and minutes as it is independent of geographic distance travelled. Flight time can be affected by wind, traffic, taxiing time, and aircraft used.

== Short-haul and long-haul ==
A flight's length can also be described using the aviation term of "Flight Haul Type", such as "short-haul" or "long-haul". Flight haul types can be defined using either flight distance or flight time.

=== Time-based definitions ===
Flight haul type definitions
	Short-haul	Medium-haul	Long-haul	Ultra-long-haul
ICAO	< 8 hours		8–16 hours	> 16 hours
IATA	< 3 hours	3–6 hours	6–16 hours	> 16 hours
CAPA	< 6 hours		6–16 hours	> 16 hours

=== Distance-based definitions ===
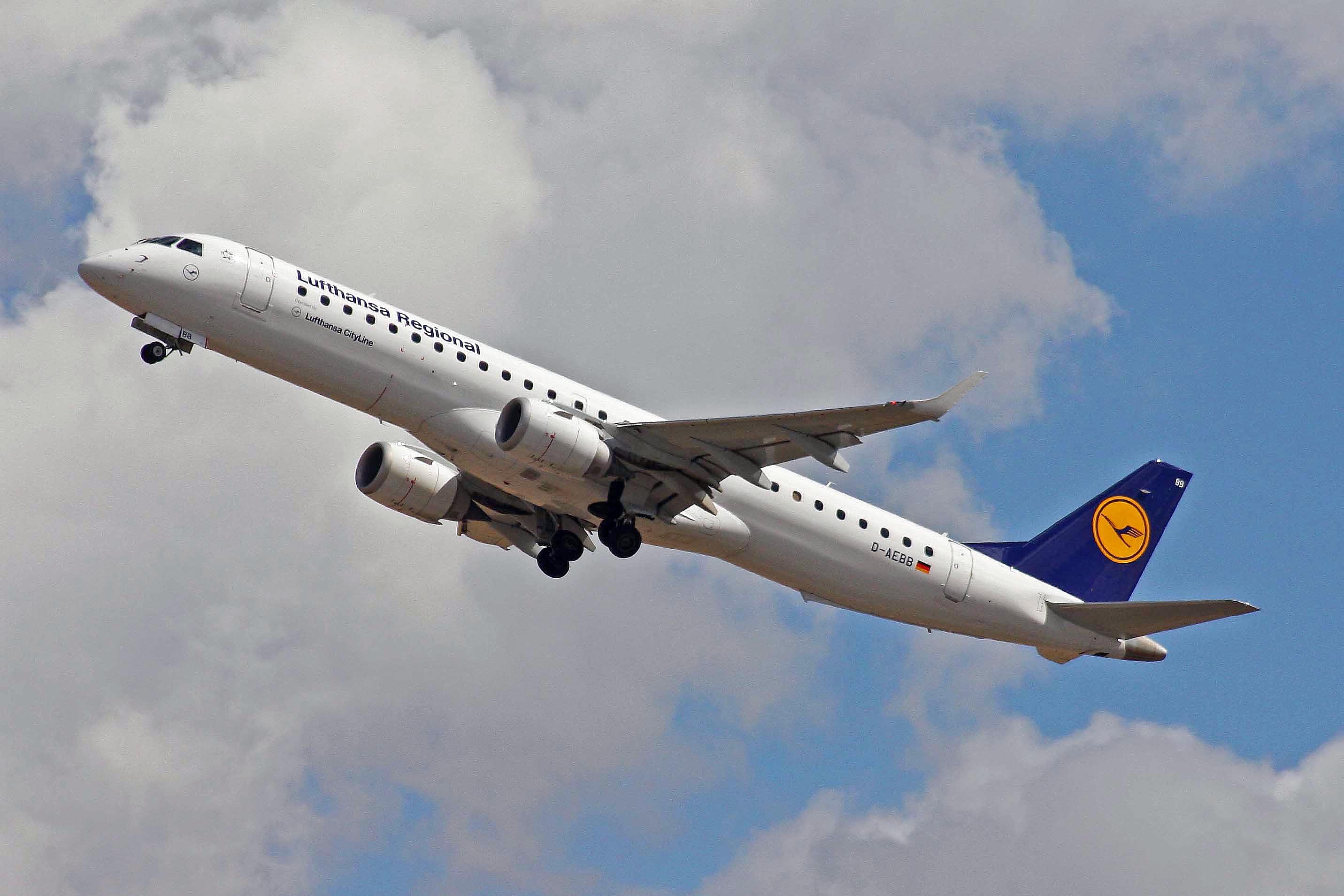
Lufthansa considers the Embraer E-190 a short-haul airliner.

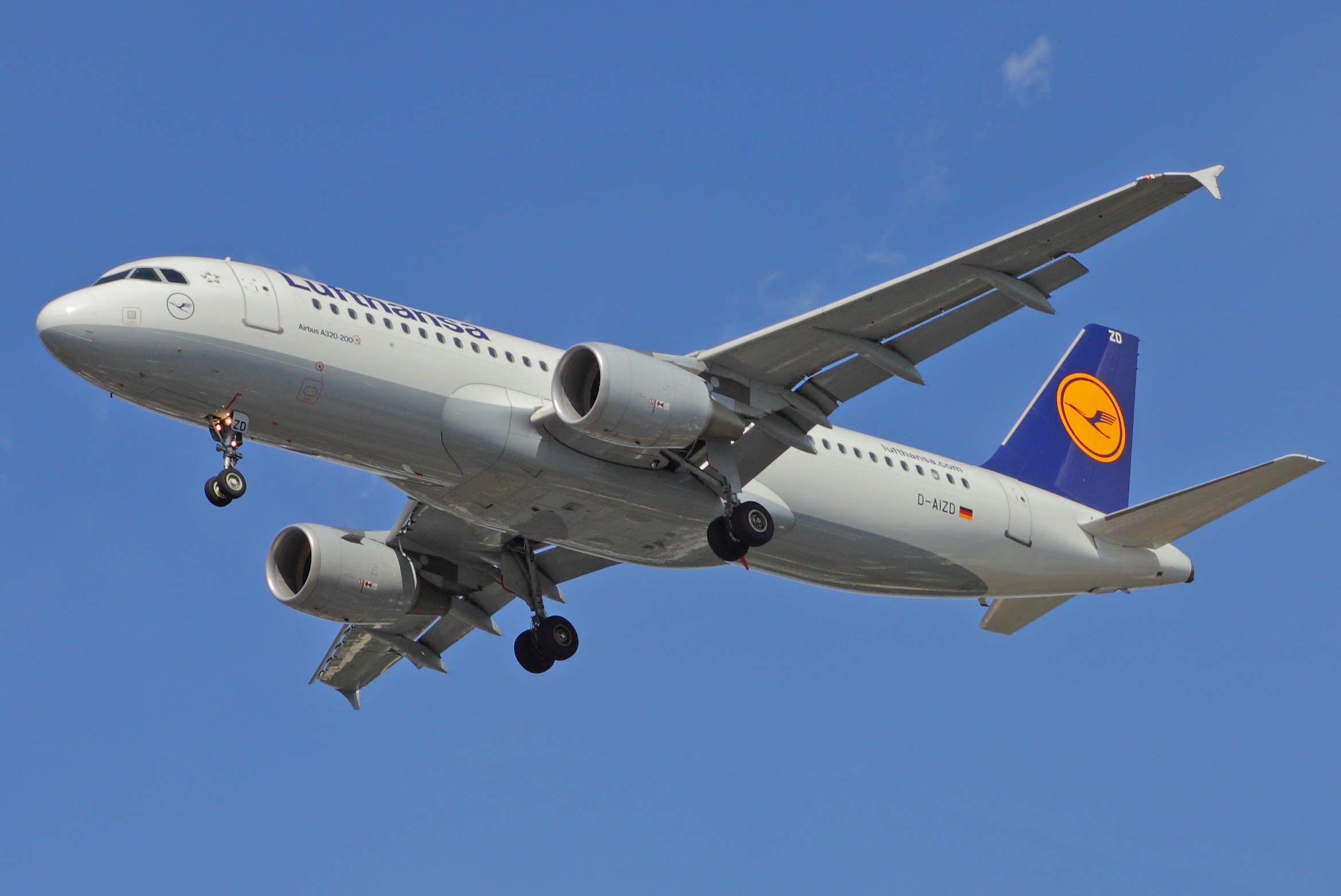
Lufthansa considers the Airbus A320 family a medium-haul airliner.

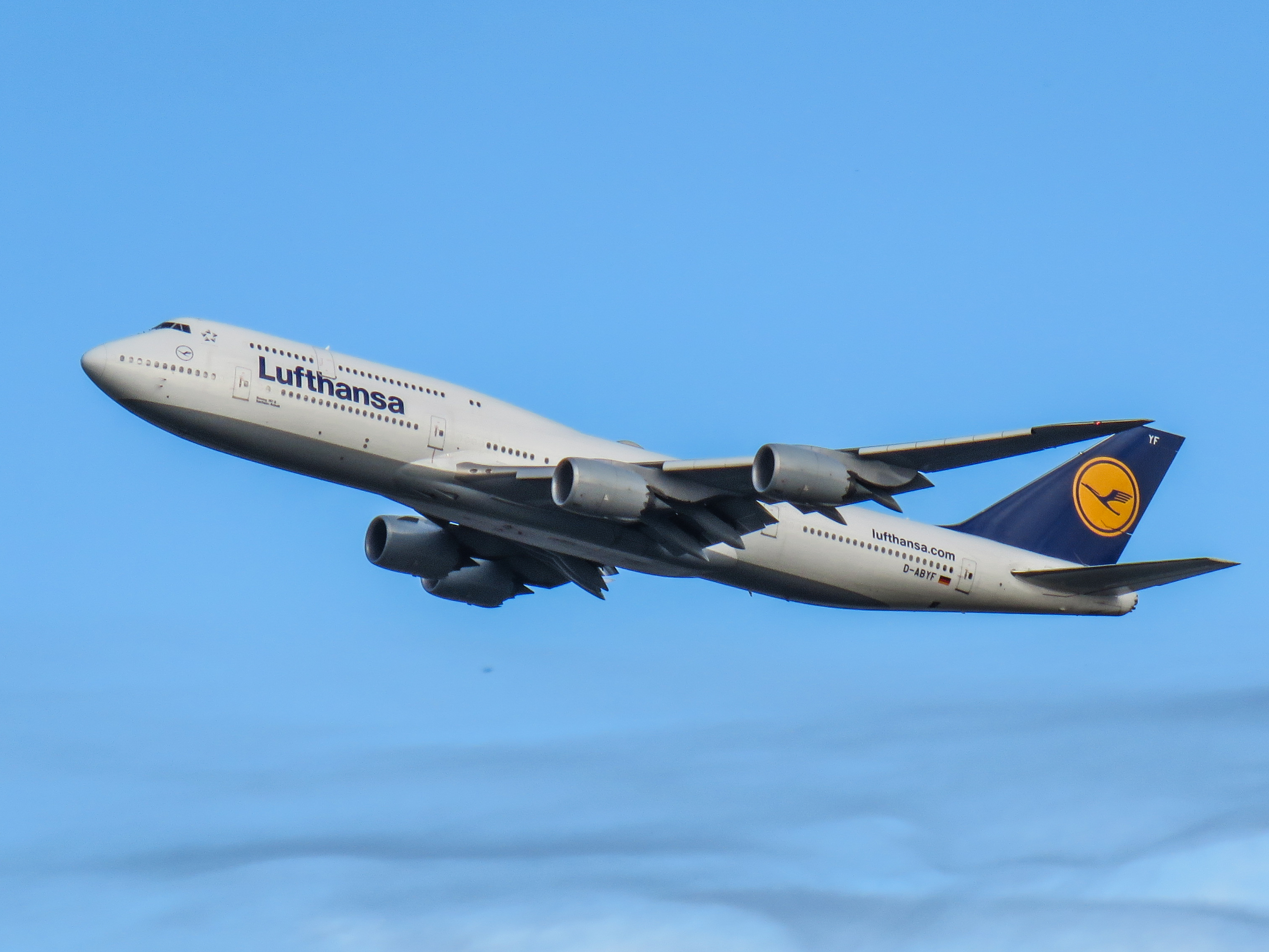
Lufthansa defines the Boeing 747-8 as a long-haul airliner.

David W. Wragg classifies air services as medium-haul being between 1,600–4,000 km; 900–2,200 nmi; short-haul as being shorter and long-haul as being longer. David Crocker defines short-haul flights as shorter than 1,000 km (540 nmi), and long-haul as the opposite.

==== Asia and Australia ====
- Hong Kong International Airport considers destinations in the Americas, Europe, the Middle East, Africa, Southwest Pacific and the Indian Subcontinent long-haul and all others are short-haul.
- Japan Air Lines defines routes to Europe and North America as long-haul and all other flights as short-haul.
- Qatar Airways defines all flights from Qatar to the Americas, Australia, and New Zealand as Ultra-long-haul, and all other flights as medium or long-haul.
- Virgin Australia defines domestic flights as within Australia, short-haul as those to South East Asia/Pacific and long-haul as those to Abu Dhabi or Los Angeles.

==== Europe ====
- The European Union defines any passenger flight between city pairs separated by a great circle distance between 1,500 and 3,500 km (800 and 1,900 nmi) to be medium-haul, below as short-haul, and above as long-haul routes.
- Eurocontrol defines "very short-haul" flights as being less than 500 km (270 nmi), short-haul flights being between 500 and 1,500 km, medium-haul flights being between 1,500 and 4,000 km (800 and 2,200 nmi), and long-haul flights as longer than that.
- The Association of European Airlines defined Long-haul as flights to Americas, sub-Saharan Africa, Asia, Australasia and medium-haul as flights to North Africa and Middle East.
- The now defunct airline Air Berlin defined short- and medium-haul as flights to Europe/North Africa and long-haul as those to the rest of the world.
- Air France defines short-haul as domestic, medium-haul as within Europe/North Africa and long haul as the rest of the world.

==== North America ====
- American Airlines defines short-/medium-haul flights as being less than 3,000 mi (2,600 nmi; 4,800 km) and long-haul as either being more than 3000 miles or being the New York–Los Angeles and New York–San Francisco routes.
- United Airlines defines short-haul flights as being less than 700 mi (600 nmi; 1,100 km) and long-haul flights as being greater than 3,000 mi (2,600 nmi; 4,800 km).

=== Aircraft-based definitions ===
Flight Haul Type terminology are sometimes used when referring to commercial aircraft. Some commercial carriers choose to refer to their aircraft using flight haul type terms, for example:

- Delta Air Lines referred to its Boeing 717, MD-88 and MD-90 as short-haul domestic aircraft; Boeing 757, Boeing 737, Airbus A319 and A321 as long-haul domestic; and its transoceanic Boeing 757, 767, 777 and Airbus A330 as long-haul.
- Lufthansa classifies its fleet as: long-haul for wide-body aircraft such as the Airbus A330/Airbus A340, Airbus A350, Airbus A380, Boeing 747, and Boeing 787 Dreamliner; medium-haul for narrow-body aircraft like the Airbus A320 and 737 families; and short-haul for regional jets like the Embraer E-Jets and the Bombardier CRJ-900.
- TUI Airways refers to their Boeing 737 as a short and mid-haul airliner and the Boeing 767 and 787 as long haul.

While they are capable of flying further, long-haul capable wide-bodies are often used on shorter trips. In 2017, - 40% of A350 routes were shorter than 2,000 nmi (2,300 mi; 3,700 km), 50% of A380 flights fell within 2,000–4,000 nmi (2,300–4,600 mi; 3,700–7,400 km), 70% of 777-200ER routes were shorter than 4,000 nmi (4,600 mi; 7,400 km), 80% of 787-9s routes were shorter than 5,000 nmi (5,800 mi; 9,300 km), 70% of 777-200LRs flights were shorter than 6,000 nmi (6,900 mi; 11,000 km).

== Shortest and longest commercial flights ==
=== Shortest ===
The Westray to Papa Westray flight in Orkney, operated by Loganair, is the shortest commercial flight in the world, covering 2.8 km (1.7 mi) in two minutes scheduled flight time including taxiing.

=== Longest ===
The world's longest ever commercial flight was Air Tahiti Nui Flight TN64 in early 2020. Due to the COVID-19 pandemic and the impossibility of transit in the United States through Los Angeles International Airport, Air Tahiti Nui scheduled and operated in March and April 2020 Flight TN64 as a non-stop flight between Papeete and Paris-Charles de Gaulle, using a Boeing 787-9 and covering 15,715 km (9,765 mi; 8,485 nmi). in 16 hours and 20 minutes. As of 2023, it continues to hold the record for the longest ever scheduled commercial nonstop flight (by great circle distance) as well as the world's longest domestic flight.

As of November 9, 2020, Singapore Airlines Flights 23 and 24 are the world's longest active commercial flight between Singapore and New York–JFK, covering 15,349 km (9,537 mi; 8,288 nmi) in around 18 hours and 40 minutes, operated by an Airbus A350-900ULR.

== Distinctions ==
=== Great-circle distance versus flight length ===
Airline routes between San Francisco and Tokyo following the most direct great circle (top) westward, and following a longer-distance jet stream route (bottom) when heading eastward

The shortest distance between two geographical points is the great-circle distance. In the example (right), the aircraft travelling westward from North America to Japan is following a great-circle route extending northward towards the Arctic region. The apparent curve of the route is a result of distortion when plotted onto a conventional map projection and makes the route appear to be longer than it really is. Stretching a string between North America and Japan on a globe will demonstrate why this really is the shortest route despite appearances.

The actual flight length is the length of the track flown across the ground in practice, which is usually longer than the ideal great-circle and is influenced by a number of factors such as the need to avoid bad weather, wind direction and speed, fuel economy, navigational restrictions and other requirements. In the example, easterly flights from Japan to North America are shown taking a longer, more southerly, route than the shorter great-circle; this is to take advantage of the favourable jet stream, a fast high-altitude tail-wind that assists the aircraft along its ground track that can save more time or fuel than the geographically shortest route.

=== Flight distance versus flight duration ===
Even for flights with the same origin and destination, a flight's duration can be affected by routing, wind, traffic, taxiing time, or aircraft used.

For example, on the Luxembourg to Bucharest route operated by Luxair, the scheduled flight length remains constant while the flight duration varies depending on aircraft used. On Thursday mornings, Luxair operates a DHC-8 turboprop with a scheduled duration of approximately 3 hours, while on Saturday mornings, Luxair's use of an Embraer 190 jet reduces the scheduled duration of the flight down to approximately 2 hours 20 minutes.

== Human resource management ==
The length of a flight has significant human resource management implications.

With longer flights, it becomes less likely that the same crew and aircraft can finish a complete round trip between two airports within a single workday. As the flight length increases, the number of crew members and the number of crews needed greatly increases.

First, for long-haul flights, airlines provide for additional crew members on board to provide in-flight crew relief to prevent individual crew members from becoming dangerously exhausted, and arrange for crew members to rotate in shifts through a crew rest compartment while in flight.

Second, crew members need significant downtime to rest between the longest flights. For example, for Air Canada's 17-hour flight from Vancouver to Sydney, the crew does not immediately turn around and fly on the same aircraft back to Vancouver. The crew is entitled to 24 hours of rest. Therefore, providing regular daily intercontinental service in one direction actually requires two crews: one crew to staff today's flight and a second crew on their day off at the other end.

== See also ==
- Endurance (aeronautics)
- Flight distance record
- Fuel economy in aircraft
- International flight
- List of regional airliners
- Longest flights
- Non-stop flight
- Range (aeronautics)
- Short-haul flight ban
- Ultra long haul flight
