= Relativistic rocket =

Type of spacecraft

Relativistic rocket means any spacecraft that travels close enough to light speed for relativistic effects to become significant. The meaning of "significant" is a matter of context, but often a threshold velocity of 30% to 50% of the speed of light (0.3c to 0.5c) is used. At 30% c, the difference between relativistic mass and rest mass is only about 5%, while at 50% it is 15%, (at 0.75c the difference is over 50%); so above such speeds special relativity is needed to accurately describe motion, while below this range Newtonian physics and the Tsiolkovsky rocket equation usually give sufficient accuracy.

In this context, a rocket is defined as an object carrying all of its reaction mass, energy, and engines with it.

No known technology can bring a rocket to relativistic speed. Relativistic rockets require huge advances in spacecraft propulsion, energy storage, and engine efficiency which may or may not ever be possible. Nuclear pulse propulsion could theoretically reach 0.1c using current known technology, but would still require many engineering advances to achieve this. The relativistic gamma factor $\gamma$ at 10% of light velocity is 1.005. A 0.1c speed rocket is thus considered non-relativistic since its motion is still quite accurately described by Newtonian physics alone.

Relativistic rockets are usually seen discussed in the context of interstellar travel, since most would need a lot of space to reach such speed. They are also found in some thought experiments such as the twin paradox.

== Relativistic rocket equation ==
As with the classical rocket equation, one wants to calculate the velocity change $\Delta v$ that a rocket can achieve depending on the exhaust speed $v_e$ and the mass ratio, i. e. the ratio of starting rest mass $m_0$ and rest mass at the end of the acceleration phase (dry mass) $m_1$.

In order to make calculations simpler, we assume that the acceleration is constant (in the rocket's reference frame) during the acceleration phase; still, the result is nonetheless valid if the acceleration varies, as long as exhaust velocity $v_e$ is constant.

In the nonrelativistic case, one knows from the (classical) Tsiolkovsky rocket equation that

$$\Delta v = v_e \ln \frac {m_0}{m_1}.$$

Assuming constant acceleration $a$, the time span $t$ during which the acceleration takes place is

$$t = \frac {v_e}{a} \ln \frac {m_0}{m_1}.$$

In the relativistic case, the equation is still valid if $a$ is the acceleration in the rocket's reference frame and $t$ is the rocket's proper time because at velocity 0 the relationship between force and acceleration is the same as in the classical case. Solving this equation for the ratio of initial mass to final mass gives

$$\frac{m_0}{m_1} = \exp\left[\frac{at}{v_e}\right].$$

where "exp" is the exponential function. Another related equation gives the mass ratio in terms of the end velocity $\Delta v$ relative to the rest frame (i. e. the frame of the rocket before the acceleration phase):

$$\frac{m_0}{m_1} = \left[\frac{1 + {\frac{\Delta v}{c}}}{1 - {\frac{\Delta v}{c}}}\right]^{\frac{c}{2v_e}}.$$

For constant acceleration, $\frac{\Delta v}{c} = \tanh\left[\frac{at}{c}\right]$ (with a and t again measured on board the rocket), so substituting this equation into the previous one and using the hyperbolic function identity $\tanh x = \frac{e^{2x} - 1} {e^{2x} + 1}$ returns the earlier equation $\frac{m_0}{m_1} = \exp\left[\frac{at}{v_e}\right]$.

By applying the Lorentz transformation, one can calculate the end velocity $\Delta v$ as a function of the rocket frame acceleration and the rest frame time $t'$; the result is

$$\Delta v = \frac {a t'} {\sqrt{1 + \frac{(a t')^2}{c^2}}}.$$

The time in the rest frame relates to the proper time by the hyperbolic motion equation:

$$t' = \frac{c}{a} \sinh \left(\frac{a t}{c} \right).$$

Substituting the proper time from the Tsiolkovsky equation and substituting the resulting rest frame time in the expression for $\Delta v$, one gets the desired formula:

$$\Delta v = c \tanh \left(\frac {v_e}{c} \ln \frac{m_0}{m_1} \right).$$

The formula for the corresponding rapidity (the inverse hyperbolic tangent of the velocity divided by the speed of light) is simpler:

$$\Delta r = \frac {v_e}{c} \ln \frac{m_0}{m_1}.$$

Since rapidities, contrary to velocities, are additive, they are useful for computing the total $\Delta v$ of a multistage rocket.

== Matter-antimatter annihilation rockets ==
Antimatter rockets would offer the highest specific impulse of any known rocket technology and thus would most easily be able to achieve relativistic speeds, though the change of mass due to annihilation means the above rocket equation does not hold. Other antimatter rockets in addition to the photon rocket that can provide a 0.6c specific impulse (studied for basic hydrogen-antihydrogen annihilation, no ionization, no recycling of the radiation) needed for interstellar flight include the "beam core" pion rocket. In a pion rocket, frozen antihydrogen is stored inside electromagnetic bottles. Antihydrogen, like regular hydrogen, is diamagnetic which allows it to be electromagnetically levitated when refrigerated. Temperature control of the storage volume is used to determine the rate of vaporization of the frozen antihydrogen, up to a few grams per second (hence several petawatts when annihilated with equal amounts of matter). It is then ionized into antiprotons which can be electromagnetically accelerated into the reaction chamber. The positrons are usually discarded since their annihilation only produces harmful gamma rays with negligible effect on thrust. However, non-relativistic rockets may exclusively rely on these gamma rays for propulsion. This process is necessary because un-neutralized antiprotons repel one another, limiting the number that may be stored with current technology to less than a trillion.

=== Design notes on a pion rocket ===
The pion rocket has been studied independently by Robert Frisbee and Ulrich Walter, with similar results. Pions, short for pi-mesons, are produced by proton-antiproton annihilation. The antihydrogen or the antiprotons extracted from it will be mixed with a mass of regular protons pumped into the magnetic confinement nozzle of a pion rocket engine, usually as part of hydrogen atoms. The resulting charged pions have a speed of 0.94c (i.e. $\beta$ = 0.94), and a Lorentz factor $\gamma$ of 2.93 which extends their lifespan enough to travel 21 meters through the nozzle before decaying into muons. 60% of the pions will have either a negative, or a positive electric charge. 40% of the pions will be neutral. The neutral pions decay immediately into gamma rays. These can't be reflected by any known material at the energies involved, though they can undergo Compton scattering. They can be absorbed efficiently by a shield of tungsten placed between the pion rocket engine reaction volume and the crew modules and various electromagnets to protect them from the gamma rays. The consequent heating of the shield will make it radiate visible light, which could then be collimated to increase the rocket's specific impulse. The remaining heat will also require the shield to be refrigerated. The charged pions would travel in helical spirals around the axial electromagnetic field lines inside the nozzle and in this way the charged pions could be collimated into an exhaust jet moving at 0.94c. In realistic matter/antimatter reactions, this jet only represents a fraction of the reaction's mass-energy: over 60% of it is lost as gamma-rays, collimation is not perfect, and some pions are not reflected backward by the nozzle. Thus, the effective exhaust speed for the entire reaction drops to just 0.58c. Alternate propulsion schemes include physical confinement of hydrogen atoms in an antiproton and pion-transparent beryllium reaction chamber with collimation of the reaction products achieved with a single external electromagnet; see Project Valkyrie.

== See also ==
- The Bussard ramjet

== General references ==
- The star flight handbook, Matloff & Mallove, 1989.
- Mirror matter: pioneering antimatter physics, Dr. Robert L Forward, 1986
