= Radius of action =

Military term

Radius of action, combat radius, or combat range in military terms, refers to the maximum distance a ship, aircraft, or vehicle can travel away from its base along a given course with normal load and return without refueling, allowing for all safety and operating factors.

A given aircraft's radius of action varies according to the altitude of its flight plan, amount of weight (ordnance in a military context) it is carrying, and whether or not it carries external drop tanks full of fuel.

- An aircraft engaged in low-level (lo) flight will have a smaller radius of action than the same one engaged in a high-level (hi) mission, due to higher fuel consumption at lower altitudes (higher atmospheric pressure/air density).
- An aircraft with more and heavier load (ordnance in military terms) will have a smaller radius of action (combat radius in military terms) than the same one with less and lighter load, due to higher fuel consumption at heavier weights.
- An aircraft with drop tanks will have a greater radius of action than the same one without.

In military aviation, the combat radius of an aircraft is often given with its mission profile (without in-air refueling). For example:

- The F-16 Fighting Falcon's combat radius is 550 km (295 nmi) on a hi-lo-hi mission with six 450 kg (1,000 lb) bombs.
- The F/A-18 Hornet has a combat radius of 537 km (290 nmi) on a hi-lo-lo-hi mission.

The radius of action of an aircraft is always smaller than its maximum range, the furthest distance the aircraft can fly with maximum payload and without refueling, or ferry range, the furthest distance the aircraft can fly with drop tanks, no load or ordnance and without refueling. The rule of thumb is that the radius of action is one-third the distance an aircraft can fly in a straight line on a full load of fuel. In military aviation, this assumes a trip out and back, plus one-third of fuel for combat operations.

== See also ==
- Range (aeronautics)
