= Payload fraction =

Measure of aircraft/spacecraft efficiency

In aerospace engineering, payload fraction is a common term used to characterize the efficiency of a particular design. The payload fraction is the quotient of the payload mass and the total vehicle mass at the start of its journey. It is a function of specific impulse, propellant mass fraction and the structural coefficient. In aircraft, loading less than full fuel for shorter trips is standard practice to reduce weight and fuel consumption. For this reason, the useful load fraction calculates a similar number, but it is based on the combined weight of the payload and fuel together in relation to the total weight.

Propeller-driven airliners had useful load fractions on the order of 25–35%. Modern jet airliners have considerably higher useful load fractions, on the order of 45–55%.

For orbital rockets the payload fraction is between 1% and 5%, while the useful load fraction is perhaps 90%.

== Examples ==
Vehicle	Liftoff mass	Payload mass to LEO	Mass ratio	Payload fraction
Falcon 9 Block 5	549,054 kg + 22,800 kg	22,800 kg	25.1	3.99%
Proton-M	705,000 kg + 23,000 kg	23,000 kg	31.7	3.16%
Long March 3B/E	458,970 kg + 11,500 kg	11,500 kg	40.9	2.44%
Ariane 6	860,000 kg + 21,500 kg	21,500 kg	41.0	2.44%
Electron	13,000 kg + 300 kg	300 kg	44.3	2.26%
Soyuz-2.1b	312,000 kg + 8,200 kg	8,200 kg	40.0	2.50%
Space Shuttle	2,030,000 kg	27,500 kg	73.8	1.35%
Apollo 17 Saturn V	2,961,860 kg	48,609 kg to TLI	60.9	1.64%
Apollo 17 Lunar Module Descent stage	36,362 lb	10,542.8 lb (LLO to Moon)	3.45	29.0%
Apollo 17 Lunar Module Ascent stage	10,542.8 lb	552.1 lb (Moon to LLO)	19.1	5.24%
V-2	12,805 kg	1,000 kg (320 km distance suborbital)	12.8	7.81%

For payload fractions and fuel fractions in aviation, see Fuel fraction.

== See also ==
- Tsiolkovsky rocket equation
