= William Moore (mathematician) =

British mathematician

William Moore (fl. 1806 – c. 1823) was a British mathematician and early contributor to rocket theory. He worked at the Royal Military Academy, Woolwich. His 1813 Treatise was the first exposition of rocket mechanics based on Newton's third law of motion. Little is known of his life, because many relevant historical documents were destroyed by German bombing in World War II.

== Publications ==
- Theory on the motion of Rockets (1810)
- A Treatise on the Doctrine of Fluxations (1811)
- A Treatise on the Motion of Rockets; to which is added, an Essay on Naval Gunnery (1813)

== See also ==
- Konstantin Tsiolkovsky
- Tsiolkovsky rocket equation
