= Mass ratio (disambiguation) =

Mass ratio may refer to:

- Mass ratio (physics), the ratio of two mass values
- Rocket mass ratio
- Mass ratio (meteorology)
- Mass ratio (mixtures)
- Mass fraction (chemistry)
