= Combat endurance =

Military statistic

Combat endurance is the time that a military system or unit can remain in combat before having to withdraw due to depleted resources. The definition is not precise; for example the combat endurance of an aircraft, without qualification, is usually the time the aircraft can remain at an altitude suitable for combat, but in a particular theatre of operations it is the time it can remain in the area of combat. During the Battle of Britain, for example, the combat endurance of German fighters was the time they could remain over Britain, i.e., their inherent (endurance)less the time to travel from their base to Britain, and the time to return—about 15 minutes.

In addition to fuel the expenditure of ammunition and other consumables will reduce combat endurance, for example the limiting factors for a nuclear attack submarine are its torpedoes or for a nuclear aircraft carrier aviation fuel and aircraft munitions.

Military units will have a combat endurance, how long they can stay in the field for, measured by how long its logistics train can keep its component subunits supplied with food, fuel, ammunition and spare parts etc.

The United States Department of Defense and NATO define endurance as "the time an aircraft can continue flying, or a ground vehicle or ship can continue operating, under specified conditions, e.g., without refueling."

Combat endurance training is also used for a system of physical training associated with stamina.

== Improving combat endurance ==
The improvements of combat endurance are largely concerned with better efficiency to the current platforms and they aim to bridge the gap between the resources available today and the future. Technology, therefore, dominates this field and one specific aspect that demonstrates this involves the technologies that enhance fuel efficiency. There are three improvement categories focused on this area:

- fundamental: involves new vehicle configurations that affect overall aerodynamics and structural efficiency; new propulsion architecture and over the longer term fuels
- major subsystem increments: engine improvements and use of new structural materials
- small component evolution: use of more efficient generators, thrusters, and material substitution, among others

The U.S. Department of Defense identified three breakthrough technologies that could significantly improve its capabilities and combat endurance and these are: 1) blended wing body for fixed-wing, heavy-lift aircraft; 2) variable speed tilt rotor for vertical lift aircraft; and, 3) blast bucket design concept for light armor ground vehicles.
