= Endurance (aeronautics) =

Maximum length of time an aircraft can remain in cruising flight

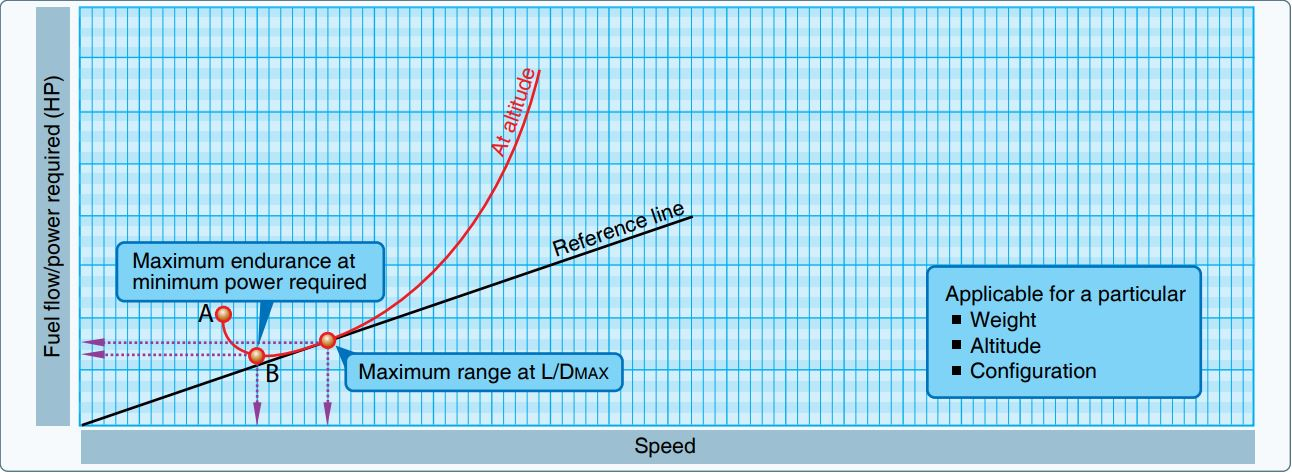
Maximum Endurance and Range versus airspeed. The maximum endurance condition would be obtained at the point of minimum power required since this would require the lowest fuel flow to keep the airplane in steady, level flight. Maximum range condition would occur where the ratio of speed to power required is greatest. The maximum range condition is obtained at maximum lift/drag ratio (L/DMAX).

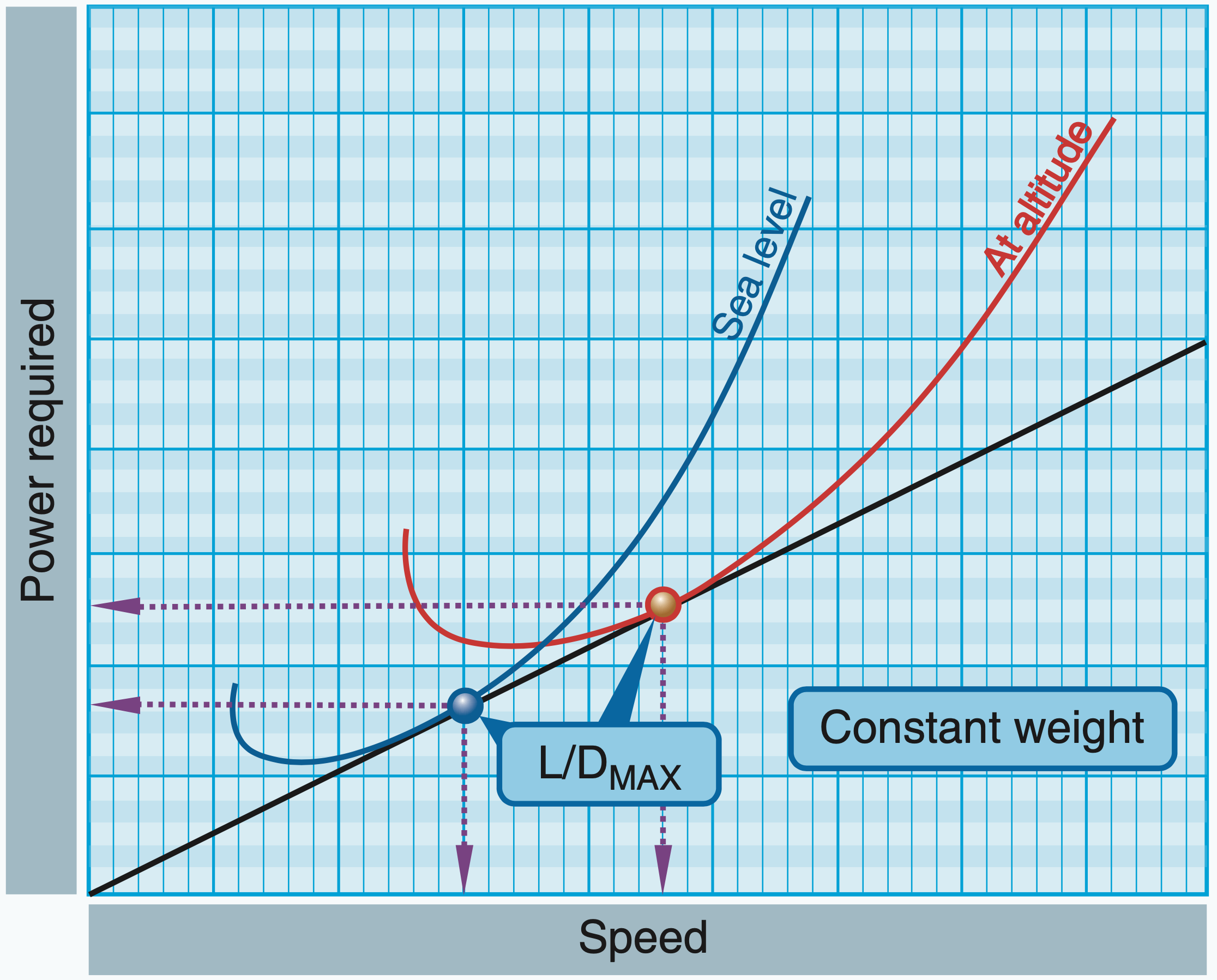
The effect of altitude on the power required of a propeller-driven aircraft with same weight. Power required is inversely proportional to the endurance for a given fuel load.

In aviation, endurance is the maximum length of time that an aircraft can spend in cruising flight. In other words, it is the amount of time an aircraft can stay in the air with one load of fuel. Endurance is different from range, which is a measure of distance flown. For example, a typical sailplane exhibits high endurance characteristics but poor range characteristics.

Endurance can be defined as:

$$E=\int_{t_1}^{t_2}dt=-\int_{W_1}^{W_2}\frac{dW}{F}=\int_{W_2}^{W_1}\frac{dW}{F}$$

where W stands for fuel weight, F for fuel flow, and t for time.

Endurance can factor into aviation design in a number of ways. Some aircraft, such as the P-3 Orion or U-2 spy plane, require high endurance characteristics as part of their mission profile (often referred to as loiter time (on target)). Endurance plays a prime factor in finding out the fuel fraction for an aircraft. Endurance, like range, is also related to fuel efficiency; fuel-efficient aircraft will tend to exhibit good endurance characteristics.
