= Fuel fraction =

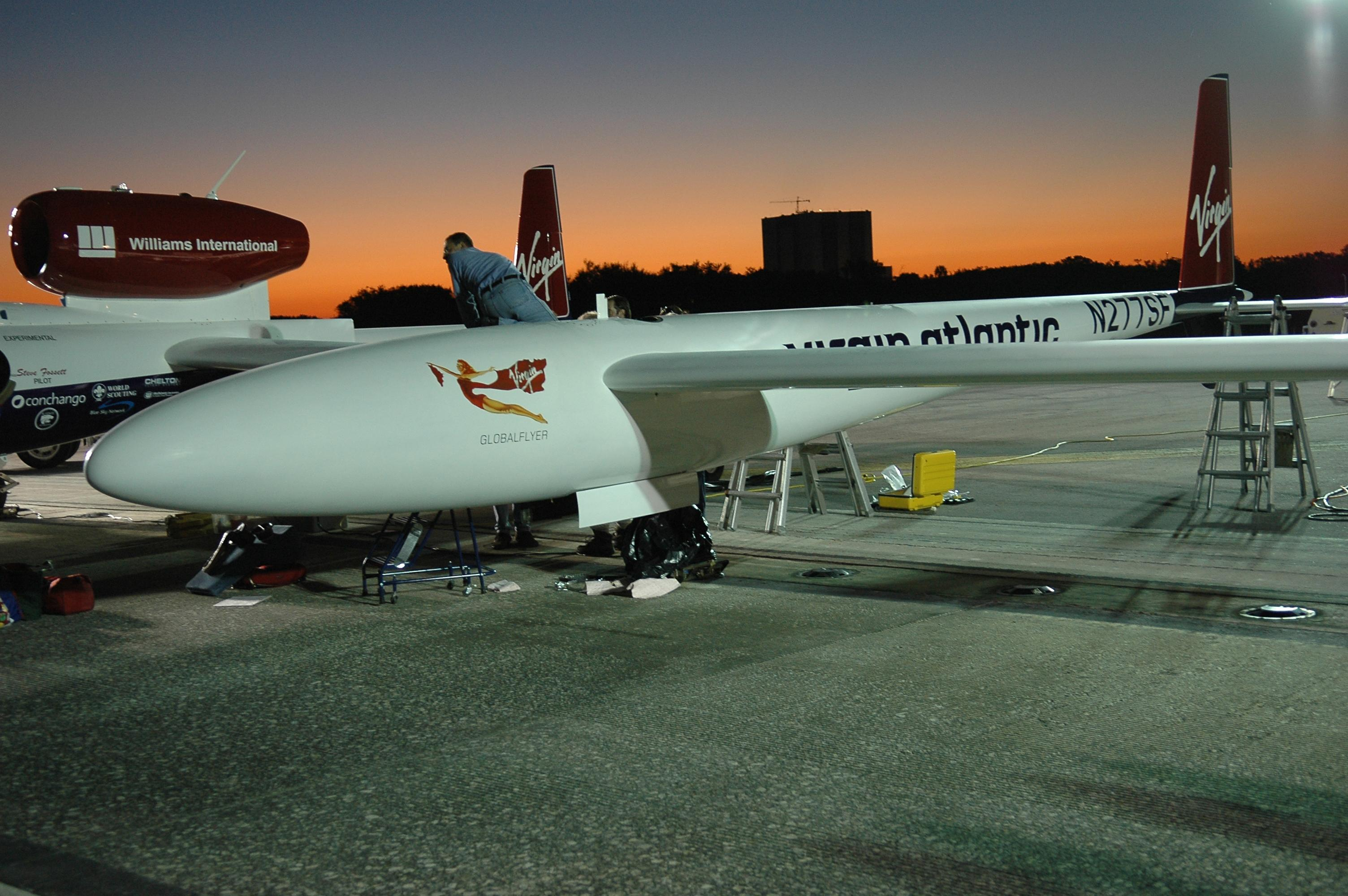
With a fuel fraction of nearly 85%, the GlobalFlyer could carry 5 times its weight in fuel.

In aerospace engineering, an aircraft's fuel fraction, fuel weight fraction, or a spacecraft's propellant fraction, is the weight of the fuel or propellant divided by the gross take-off weight of the craft (including propellant):

$$\ \zeta = \frac{\Delta W}{W_1}$$

The fractional result of this mathematical division is often expressed as a percent. For aircraft with external drop tanks, the term internal fuel fraction is used to exclude the weight of external tanks and fuel.

Fuel fraction is a key parameter in determining an aircraft's range, the distance it can fly without refueling. Breguet’s aircraft range equation describes the relationship of range with airspeed, lift-to-drag ratio, specific fuel consumption, and the part of the total fuel fraction available for cruise, also known as the cruise fuel fraction, or cruise fuel weight fraction.

In this context, the Breguet range is proportional to $-\ln(1-\ \zeta)$

== Fighter aircraft ==
At today’s state of the art for jet fighter aircraft, fuel fractions of 29 percent and below typically yield subcruisers; 33 percent provides a quasi–supercruiser; and 35 percent and above are needed for useful supercruising missions. The U.S. F-22 Raptor’s fuel fraction is 29 percent, Eurofighter is 31 percent, both similar to those of the subcruising F-4 Phantom II, F-15 Eagle and the Russian Mikoyan MiG-29 "Fulcrum". The Russian supersonic interceptor, the Mikoyan MiG-31 "Foxhound", has a fuel fraction of over 45 percent. The Panavia Tornado had a relatively low internal fuel fraction of 26 percent, and frequently carried drop tanks.

== Civilian Aircraft ==
Airliners have a fuel fraction of less than half their takeoff weight, between 26% for medium-haul to 45% for long-haul.

Model	MTOW (t)	OEW (t)	OEW Fraction	Fuel capacity (t)	Fuel fraction	Payload Max. (t)	Payload fraction
Airbus A380	575.0	285.0	49.6%	254.0	44.2%	84.0	14.6%
Boeing 777-300ER	351.5	167.8	47.7%	145.5	41.4%	69.9	19.9%
Boeing 777F	347.8	144.4	41.5%	145.5	41.8%	102.9	29.6%
Boeing 777-200LR	347.5	145.2	41.8%	145.5	41.9%	64.0	18.4%
Boeing 767-300F	186.9	86.1	46.1%	73.4	39.3%	54.0	28.9%
Airbus A350-1000	322.0	155.0	48.1%	124.7	38.7%	67.3	20.9%
Airbus A350-900	283.0	142.4	50.3%	110.5	39.0%	53.3	18.8%
Airbus A350F	319.0	131.7	41.3%	131.7	41.3%	111.0	34.8%
Boeing 787-9	254.7	128.8	50.6%	101.5	39.9%	52.6	20.7%
Airbus A330-300	242.0	129.4	53.5%	109.2	45.1%	45.6	18.8%
Airbus A330-200	242	120.6	49.8%	109.2	45.1%	49.4	20.4%
Airbus A330-200F	233	109.4	47.0%	109.2	46.9%	68.6	29.4%
Boeing 787-8	227.9	120.0	52.7%	101.3	44.4%	41.1	18.0%
Airbus A320ceo	79	44.3	56.1%	23.3	29.5%	20	25.3%
Boeing 737-800	79	41.4	52.4%	20.9	26.5%	21.3	27%
Bombardier CS300	70.9	37.1	52.3%	17.3	24.4%	18.7	26.4%
Bombardier CS100	63.1	35.2	55.3%	17.5	27.7%	15.1	23.9%
McDonnell Douglas MD-11F	286.0	112.7	39.4%	117.4	41.0%	92.0	32.2%
Ilyushin IL-76TD-90VD	195.0	92.5	47.4%	90.0	46.2%	50.0	25.6%
Boeing 747-8F	447.7	197.1	44.0%	181.6	40.6%	132.6	29.6%
Concorde	185.1	78.7	42.5%	95.7	51.7%	12.7	6.9%
Virgin Atlantic Globalflyer	10.1	1.6	16.1%	8.4	82.9%	0.1	1.0%

== General aviation ==
The Rutan Voyager took off on its 1986 around-the-world flight at 72 percent, the highest figure ever at the time. Steve Fossett's Virgin Atlantic GlobalFlyer could attain a fuel fraction of nearly 83 percent, meaning that it carried more than five times its empty weight in fuel.

== See also ==
- Mass ratio
