= Rocket mass ratio =

Measure of the efficiency of a rocket based on its propellant's mass

In aerospace engineering, rocket mass ratio or simply mass ratio is a measure of the efficiency of a rocket. It describes how much more massive the vehicle is with propellant than without. It is the ratio of the rocket's wet mass (vehicle plus contents plus propellant) to its dry mass (vehicle plus contents). A more efficient rocket design requires less propellant to achieve a given goal, and would therefore have a lower mass ratio; however, for any given efficiency a higher mass ratio typically permits the vehicle to achieve higher delta-v.

The mass ratio is a useful quantity for back-of-the-envelope rocketry calculations: it is an easy number to derive from either $\Delta{v}$ or from rocket and propellant mass, and therefore serves as a handy bridge between the two. It is also a useful for getting an impression of the size of a rocket: while two rockets with mass fractions of, say, 92% and 95% may appear similar, the corresponding mass ratios of 12.5 and 20 clearly indicate that the latter system requires much more propellant.

Typical multistage rockets have mass ratios in the range from 8 to 20. The Space Shuttle, for example, has a mass ratio around 16.

== Derivation ==
The definition arises naturally from Tsiolkovsky's rocket equation:
$$\Delta v = v_\text{e} \ln \frac{m_0}{m_1},$$
where Δv is the desired change in the rocket's velocity, v_{e} is the effective exhaust velocity (see specific impulse), m_{0} is the initial mass (rocket plus contents plus propellant), m_{1} is the final mass (rocket plus contents).

This equation can be rewritten in the following equivalent form:
$$\frac{m_0}{m_1} = e^{\Delta v / v_\text{e}}.$$
The fraction on the left-hand side of this equation is the rocket's mass ratio by definition.

This equation indicates that a Δv of $n$ times the exhaust velocity requires a mass ratio of $e^n$. For instance, for a vehicle to achieve a $\Delta v$ of 2.5 times its exhaust velocity would require a mass ratio of $e^{2.5} \approx 12.2.$ One could say that a "velocity ratio" of $n$ requires a mass ratio of $e^n.$

== Alternative definition ==
Sutton defines the mass ratio inversely, as
$$M_\text{R} = \frac{m_1}{m_0}.$$
In this case, the values for mass fraction are always less than 1.

== See also ==
- Rocket fuel
- Propellant mass fraction
- Payload fraction
