= Fuel economy in aircraft =

Aircraft fuel efficiency

Between 1950 and 2018, efficiency per passenger grew from 0.4 to 8.2 RPK per kg of CO_{2}.

The fuel economy in aircraft is the measure of the transport energy efficiency of aircraft. Fuel efficiency is increased with better aerodynamics and by reducing weight, and with improved engine brake-specific fuel consumption and propulsive efficiency or thrust-specific fuel consumption. Endurance and range can be maximized with the optimum airspeed, and economy is better at optimum altitudes, usually higher. An airline efficiency depends on its fleet fuel burn, seating density, air cargo and passenger load factor, while operational procedures like maintenance and routing can save fuel.

Average fuel burn of new aircraft fell 45% from 1968 to 2014, a compounded annual reduction 1.3% with a variable reduction rate. In 2018, CO_{2} emissions totalled 747 million tonnes for passenger transport, for 8.5 trillion revenue passenger kilometers (RPK), giving an average of 88 grams CO_{2} per RPK; this represents 28 g of fuel per kilometer, or a 3.5 L/100 km (67 mpg_{‑US}; 81 mpg_{‑imp}) fuel consumption per passenger, on average. The worst-performing flights are short trips of from 500 to 1500 kilometers because the fuel used for takeoff is relatively large compared to the amount expended in the cruise segment, and because less fuel-efficient regional jets are typically used on shorter flights.

New technology can reduce engine fuel consumption, like higher pressure and bypass ratios, geared turbofans, open rotors, hybrid electric or fully electric propulsion; and airframe efficiency with retrofits, better materials and systems and advanced aerodynamics.

== Flight efficiency theory ==
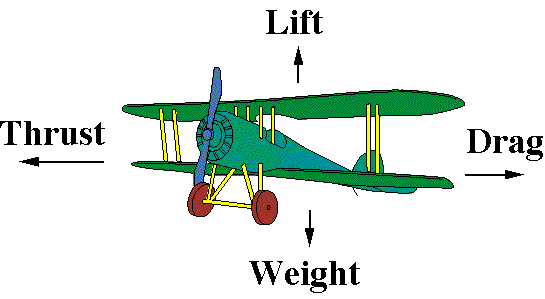
The main forces acting on an aircraft

A powered aircraft counters its weight through aerodynamic lift and counters its aerodynamic drag with thrust. The aircraft's maximum range is determined by the level of efficiency with which thrust can be applied to overcome the aerodynamic drag.

=== Aerodynamics ===
Drag forces by velocity

A subfield of fluid dynamics, aerodynamics studies the physics of a body moving through the air. As lift and drag are functions of air speed, their relationships are major determinants of an aircraft's design efficiency.

Aircraft efficiency is augmented by maximizing lift-to-drag ratio, which is attained by minimizing parasitic drag, and lift-generated induced drag, the two components of aerodynamic drag. As parasitic drag increases and induced drag decreases with speed, there is an optimum speed where the sum of both is minimal; this is the best glide ratio. For powered aircraft, the optimum glide ratio has to be balanced with thrust efficiency.

Parasitic drag is constituted by form drag and skin-friction drag, and grows with the square of the speed in the drag equation. The form drag is minimized by having the smallest frontal area and by streamlining the aircraft for a low drag coefficient, while skin friction is proportional to the body's surface area, and can be reduced by maximizing laminar flow.

Induced drag can be reduced by decreasing the size of the airframe, fuel and payload weight, and by increasing the wing aspect ratio or by using wingtip devices at the cost of increased structure weight.

==== Design speed ====
By increasing efficiency, a lower cruise-speed augments the range and reduces the environmental impact of aviation. According to a research project completed in 2024 and focusing on short to medium range passenger aircraft, design for subsonic instead of transonic speed (about 15% less speed) with turboprop instead of turbofan propulsion would save 21% of fuel compared to an aircraft of conventional design speed and similar characteristics in terms of size, range and expected general technology improvements. Another analysis from 2014 compared the Airbus 320 from 2009 with a hypothetical turboprop successor flying at a 33% lower Mach number, concluding that the slower aircraft would have 36% less fuel consumption. Both state that the decrease of fuel costs enabled by lower design speed would overcompensate the increase of time-related costs resp. the decrease in revenue passenger miles flown per day. In other words, subsonic turboprop aircraft would be more profitable than transonic turbofan aircraft even at current energy prices without additional costs related to climate action like emission fees, aviation fuel taxation or higher prices for sustainable aviation fuels compared to fossile kerosene.

For supersonic flight, drag increases at Mach 1.0 but decreases again after the transition. With a specifically designed aircraft, such as the (discontinued) Aerion AS2, the Mach 1.1 range at 3,700 nmi is 70% of the maximum range of 5,300 nmi at Mach 0.95, but increases to 4,750 nmi at Mach 1.4 for 90% before falling again.

==== Wingtip devices ====
Wingtip devices increase the effective wing aspect ratio, lowering lift-induced drag caused by wingtip vortices and improving the lift-to-drag ratio without increasing the wingspan. (Wingspan is limited by the available width in the ICAO Aerodrome Reference Code.) Airbus installed wingtip fences on its planes since the A310-300 in 1985, and Sharklet blended-winglets for the A320 were launched during the November 2009 Dubai Airshow. They add 200 kilograms (440 lb) but offer a 3.5% fuel burn reduction on flights over 2,800 km (1,500 nmi).

On average, among large commercial jets, Boeing 737-800s benefit the most from winglets. They average a 6.69% increase in efficiency but depending on the route have a fuel savings distribution spanning from 4.6% to 10.5%. Airbus A319s see the most consistent fuel and emissions savings from winglets. Airbus A321s average a 4.8% improvement in fuel consumption, but have the widest swing based on routes and individual aircraft, recognizing anywhere from 0.2% improvement to 10.75%.

=== Weight ===
The components of aircraft weight

As the weight indirectly generates lift-induced drag, its minimization leads to better aircraft efficiency. For a given payload, a lighter airframe generates a lower drag. Minimizing weight can be achieved through the airframe's configuration, materials science and construction methods. To obtain a longer range, a larger fuel fraction of the maximum takeoff weight is needed, adversely affecting efficiency.

The deadweight of the airframe and fuel is non-payload that must be lifted to altitude and kept aloft, contributing to fuel consumption. A reduction in airframe weight enables the use of smaller, lighter engines. The weight savings in both allow for a lighter fuel load for a given range and payload. A rule-of-thumb is that a reduction in fuel consumption of about 0.75% results from each 1% reduction in weight.

The payload fraction of modern twin-aisle aircraft is 18.4% to 20.8% of their maximum take-off weight, while single-aisle airliners are between 24.9% and 27.7%. An aircraft weight can be reduced with lightweight materials such as titanium, carbon fiber and other composite plastics if the expense can be recouped over the aircraft's lifetime. Fuel efficiency gains reduce the fuel carried, reducing the take-off weight for a positive feedback. For example, the Airbus A350 design includes a majority of lightweight composite materials. The Boeing 787 Dreamliner was the first airliner with a mostly composite airframe.

==== Flight distance ====
For long-haul flights, the airplane needs to carry additional fuel, leading to higher fuel consumption. Above a certain distance it becomes more fuel-efficient to make a halfway stop to refuel, despite the energy losses in descent and climb. For example, a Boeing 777-300 reaches that point at 3,000 nautical miles (5,600 km). It is more fuel-efficient to make a non-stop flight at less than this distance and to make a stop when covering a greater total distance.

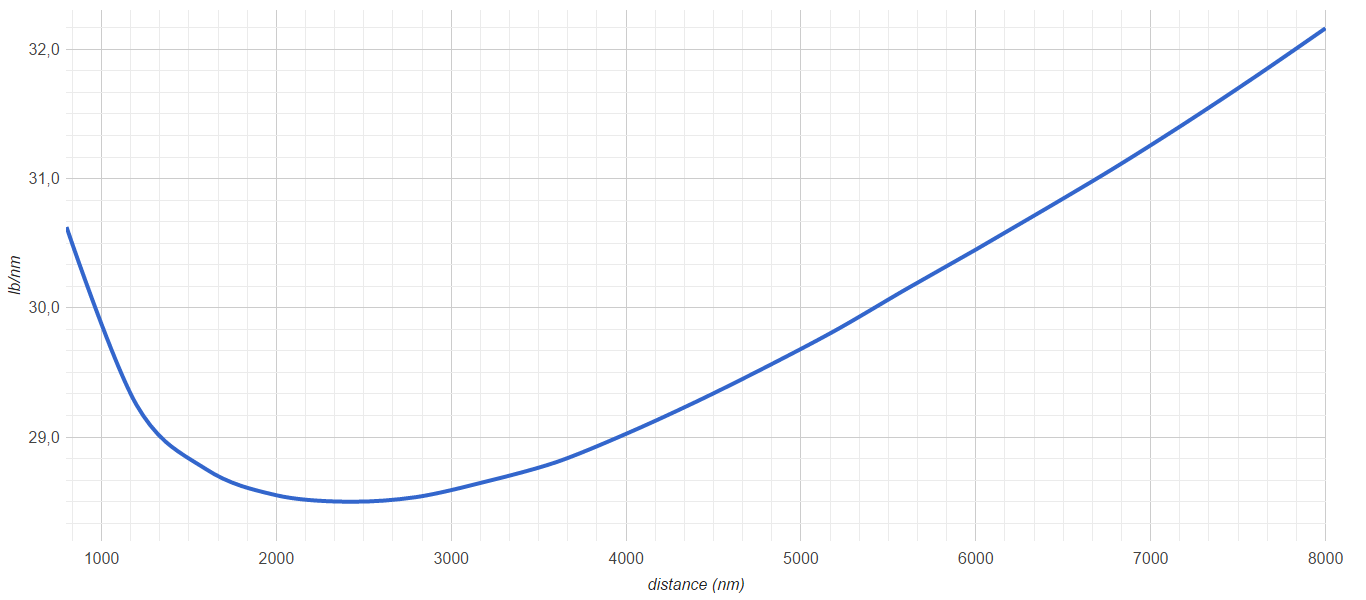
The specific range of a Boeing 777-200 per distance

Very long non-stop passenger flights suffer from the weight penalty of the extra fuel required, which means limiting the number of available seats to compensate. For such flights, the critical fiscal factor is the quantity of fuel burnt per seat-nautical mile. For these reasons, the world's longest commercial flights were cancelled c. 2013. An example is Singapore Airlines' former New York to Singapore flight, which could carry only 100 passengers (all business class) on the 10,300-mile (16,600 km) flight. According to an industry analyst, "It [was] pretty much a fuel tanker in the air." Singapore Airlines Flights 21 and 22 were re-launched in 2018 with more seats in an A350-900ULR.

In the late 2000s/early 2010s, rising fuel prices coupled with the 2008 financial crisis and the Great Recession caused the cancellation of many ultra-long haul, non-stop flights. This included the services provided by Singapore Airlines from Singapore to both Newark and Los Angeles that was ended in late 2013. But as fuel prices decreased and more fuel-efficient aircraft have come into service, many ultra-long-haul routes were reinstated or newly scheduled (see Longest flights).

=== Propulsive efficiency ===
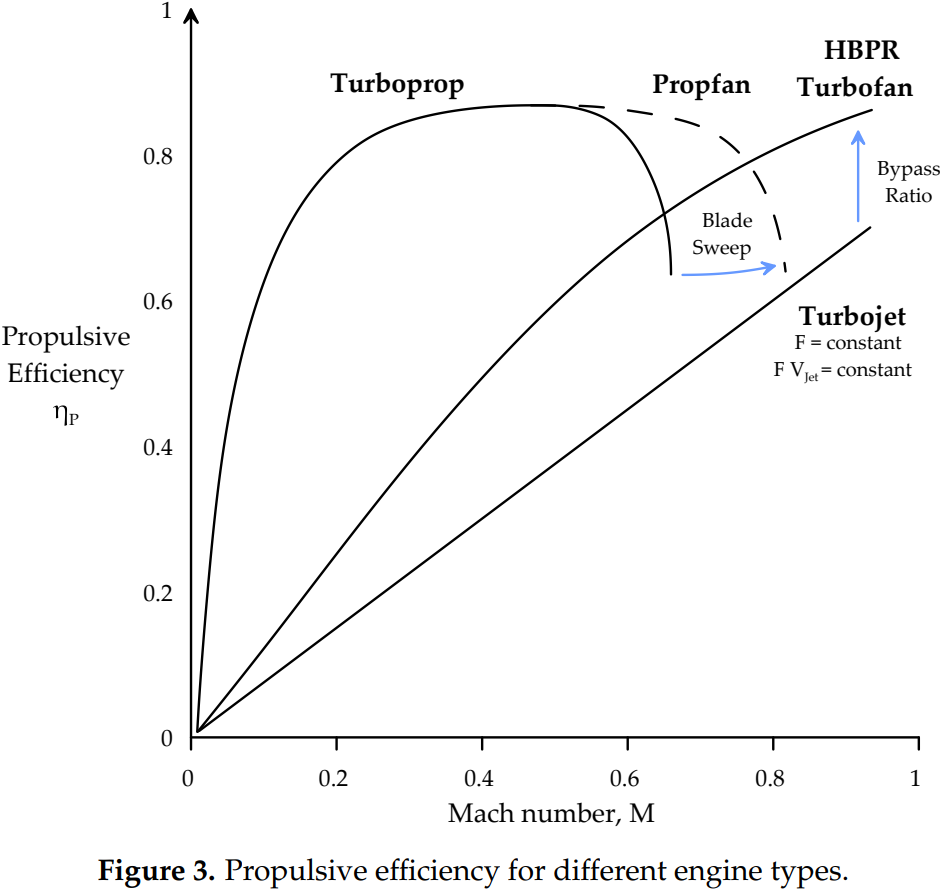
Propulsive efficiency comparison for various gas turbine engine configurations

The efficiency can be defined as the amount of energy imparted to the plane per unit of energy in the fuel. The rate at which energy is imparted equals thrust multiplied by airspeed.

To get thrust, an aircraft engine is either a shaft engine – piston engine or turboprop, with its efficiency inversely proportional to its brake-specific fuel consumption – coupled with a propeller having its own propulsive efficiency; or a jet engine with its efficiency given by its airspeed divided by the thrust-specific fuel consumption and the specific energy of the fuel.

Turboprops have an optimum speed below 460 miles per hour (740 km/h). This is less than jets used by major airlines today, but propeller planes are much more efficient. The Bombardier Dash 8 Q400 turboprop is used for this reason as a regional airliner.

Jet fuel cost and emissions reduction have renewed interest in the propfan concept for jetliners with an emphasis on engine/airframe efficiency that might come into service beyond the Boeing 787 and Airbus A350XWB. For instance, Airbus has patented aircraft designs with twin rear-mounted counter-rotating propfans. Propfans bridge the gap between turboprops, losing efficiency beyond Mach 0.5–0.6, and high-bypass turbofans, more efficient beyond Mach 0.8. NASA has conducted an Advanced Turboprop Project (ATP), where they researched a variable-pitch propfan that produced less noise and achieved high speeds.

== Operations ==
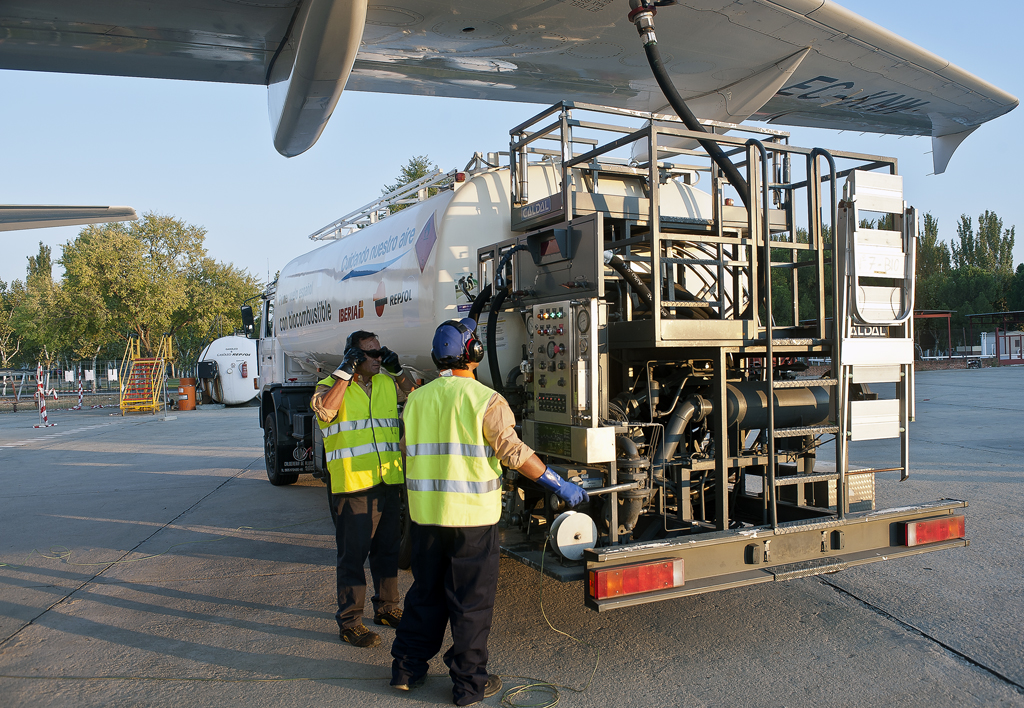
Refuelling an Airbus A320 with biofuel

In Europe in 2017, the average airline fuel consumption per passenger was 3.4 L/100 km (69 mpg_{‑US}), 24% less than in 2005, but as the traffic grew by 60% to 1,643 billion passenger kilometers, CO_{2} emissions were up by 16% to 163 million tonnes for 99.8 g/km CO_{2} per passenger. In 2018, the US airlines had a fuel consumption of 58 mpg_{‑US} (4.06 L/100 km) per revenue passenger for domestic flights, or 32.5 g of fuel per km, generating 102 g CO_{2} / RPK of emissions.

=== Seating classes ===
In 2013, the World Bank evaluated the business class carbon footprint as 3.04 times higher than economy class in wide-body aircraft, and first class 9.28 times higher, due to premium seating taking more space, lower weight factors, and larger baggage allowances (assuming Load Factors of 80% for Economy Class, 60% for Business Class, and 40% for First Class).

=== Speed ===
At constant propulsive efficiency, the maximum range speed is when the ratio between velocity and drag is minimal, while maximum endurance is attained at the best lift-to-drag ratio.

=== Altitude ===
Air density decreases with altitude, thus lowering drag, assuming the aircraft maintains a constant equivalent airspeed. However, air pressure and temperature both decrease with altitude, causing the maximum power or thrust of aircraft engines to reduce. To minimize fuel consumption, an aircraft should cruise close to the maximum altitude at which it can generate sufficient lift to maintain its altitude. As the aircraft's weight decreases throughout the flight, due to fuel burn, its optimum cruising altitude increases.

In a piston engine, the decrease in pressure at higher altitudes can be mitigated by the installation of a turbocharger.

Decreasing temperature at higher altitudes increases thermal efficiency.

=== Airlines ===
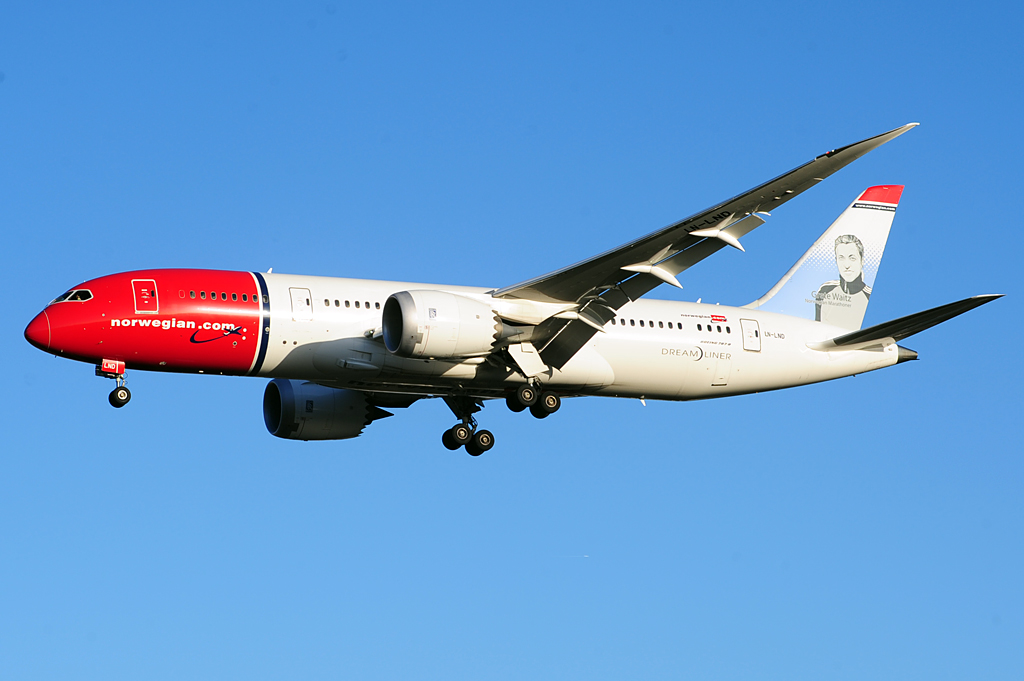
A Boeing 787-8 of Norwegian Long Haul

Since early 2006 until 2008, Scandinavian Airlines was flying slower, from 860 to 780 km/h, to save on fuel costs and curb emissions of carbon dioxide.

From 2010 to 2012, the most fuel-efficient US domestic airline was Alaska Airlines, due partly to its regional affiliate Horizon Air flying turboprops. In 2014, MSCI ranked Ryanair as the lowest-emissions-intensity airline in its ACWI index with 75 g CO_{2}-e/revenue passenger kilometer – below Easyjet at 82 g, the average at 123 g and Lufthansa at 132 g – by using high-density 189-seat Boeing 737-800s. In 2015 Ryanair emitted 8.64 Bn t of CO_{2} for 545,034 sectors flown: 15.85 t per 776 miles (674 nmi; 1,249 km) average sector (or 5.04 t of fuel: 4.04 kg/km) representing 95 kg per 90.6 million passengers (30.4 kg of fuel: 3.04 L/100 km or 76 g CO_{2}/km).

In 2016, over the transpacific routes, the average fuel consumption was 31 pax-km per L (3.23 L/100 km [73 mpg_{‑US}] per passenger). The most fuel-efficient were Hainan Airlines and ANA with 36 pax-km/L (2.78 L/100 km [85 mpg_{‑US}] per passenger) while Qantas was the least efficient at 22 pax-km/L (4.55 L/100 km [51.7 mpg_{‑US}] per passenger). Key drivers for efficiency were the air freight share for 48%, seating density for 24%, aircraft fuel burn for 16% and passenger load factor for 12%. That same year, Cathay Pacific and Cathay Dragon consumed 4,571,000 tonnes of fuel to transport 123,478 million revenue passenger kilometers, or 37 g/RPK, 25% better than in 1998: 4.63 L/100 km (50.8 mpg_{‑US}). Again in 2016, the Aeroflot Group fuel consumption is 22.9g/ASK, or 2.86 L/100 km (82 mpg_{‑US}) per seat, 3.51 L/100 km (67.0 mpg_{‑US}) per passenger at its 81.5% load factor.

Fuel economy in air transport comes from the fuel efficiency of the aircraft + engine model, combined with airline efficiency: seating configuration, passenger load factor and air cargo. Over the transatlantic route, the most-active intercontinental market, the average fuel consumption in 2017 was 34 pax-km per L (2.94 L/100 km [80 mpg_{‑US}] per passenger). The most fuel-efficient airline was Norwegian Air Shuttle with 44 pax-km/L (2.27 L/100 km [104 mpg_{‑US}] per passenger), thanks to its fuel-efficient Boeing 787-8, a high 85% passenger load factor and a high density of 1.36 seat/m^{2} due to a low 9% premium seating. On the other side, the least efficient was British Airways at 27 pax-km/L (3.7 L/100 km [64 mpg_{‑US}] per passenger), using fuel-inefficient Boeing 747-400s with a low density of 0.75 seat/m^{2} due to a high 25% premium seating, in spite of a high 82% load factor.

In 2018, CO_{2} emissions totalled 918 Mt with passenger transport accounting for 81% or 744 Mt, for 8.2 trillion revenue passenger kilometers: an average fuel economy of 90.7 g/RPK CO_{2} - 29 g/km of fuel (3.61 L/100 km [65.2 mpg_{‑US}] per passenger)

In 2019, Wizz Air stated a 57 g/RPK CO_{2} emissions (equivalent to 18.1 g/km of fuel, 2.27 L/100 km [104 mpg_{‑US}] per passenger), 40% lower than IAG or Lufthansa (95 g CO_{2}/RPK - 30 g/km of fuel, 3.8 L/100 km [62 mpg_{‑US}] per passenger), due to their business classes, lower-density seating, and flight connections.

In 2021, the highest seating density in its A330neo, with 459 single-class seats, enabled Cebu Pacific to claim the lowest carbon footprint with 1.4 kg (3 lb) of fuel per seat per 100 km, equivalent to 1.75 L/100 km [134 mpg_{‑US}] per seat.

=== Procedures ===
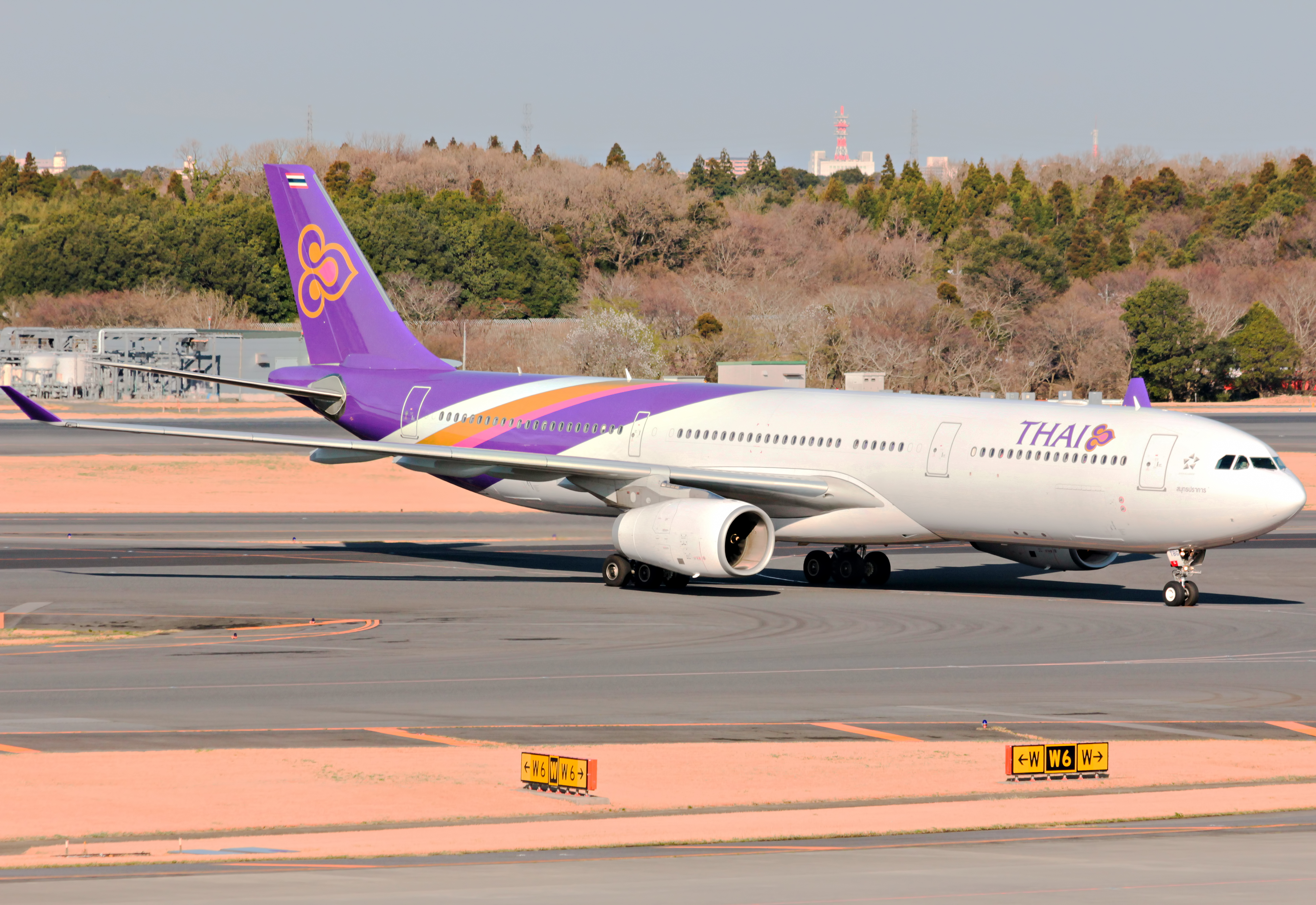
An Airbus A330-300 of Thai Airways at Tokyo Narita

Continuous Descent Approaches can reduce emissions. Beyond single-engine taxi, electric taxiing could allow taxiing on APU power alone, with the main engines shut down, to lower the fuel burn.

Airbus presented the following measures to save fuel, in its example of an Airbus A330 flying 2,500 nautical miles (4,600 km) on a route like Bangkok–Tokyo: direct routing saves 190 kg (420 lb) fuel by flying 40 km (25 mi) less; 600 kg (1,300 lb) more fuel is consumed if flying 600 m (2,000 ft) below optimum altitude without vertical flight profile optimization; cruising Mach 0.01 above the optimum speed consumes 800 kg (1,800 lb) more fuel; 1,000 kg (2,200 lb) more fuel on board consumes 150 kg (330 lb) more fuel while 100 litres (22 imp gal; 26 US gal) of unused potable water consumes 15 kg (33 lb) more fuel.

Operational procedures can save 35 kg (77 lb) fuel for every 10-minute reduction in use of the Auxiliary power unit (APU), 15 kg (33 lb) with a reduced flap approach and 30 kg (66 lb) with reduced thrust reversal on landing. Maintenance can also save fuel: 100 kg (220 lb) more fuel is consumed without an engine wash schedule; 50 kg (110 lb) with a 5 mm (0.20 in) slat rigging gap, 40 kg (88 lb) with a 10 mm (0.39 in) spoiler rigging gap, and 15 kg (33 lb) with a damaged door seal.

Yield management allows the optimization of the load factor, benefiting the fuel efficiency, as is the air traffic management optimization.

By taking advantage of wake updraft like migrating birds (biomimicry), Airbus believes an aircraft can save 5-10% of fuel by flying in formation, 1.5–2 nmi (2.8–3.7 km) behind the preceding one. After Airbus A380 tests showing 12% savings, test flights were scheduled for 2020 with two Airbus A350s, before transatlantic flight trials with airlines in 2021. Certification for shorter separation is enabled by ADS-B in oceanic airspace, and the only modification required would be flight control systems software. Comfort would not be affected and trials are limited to two aircraft to reduce complexity but the concept could be expanded to include more. Commercial operations could begin in 2025 with airline schedule adjustments, and other manufacturers' aircraft could be included.

While routes are up to 10% longer than necessary, modernized air traffic control systems using ADS-B technology like the FAA NextGen or European SESAR could allow more direct routing, but there is resistance from air traffic controllers.

== History ==
=== Past ===
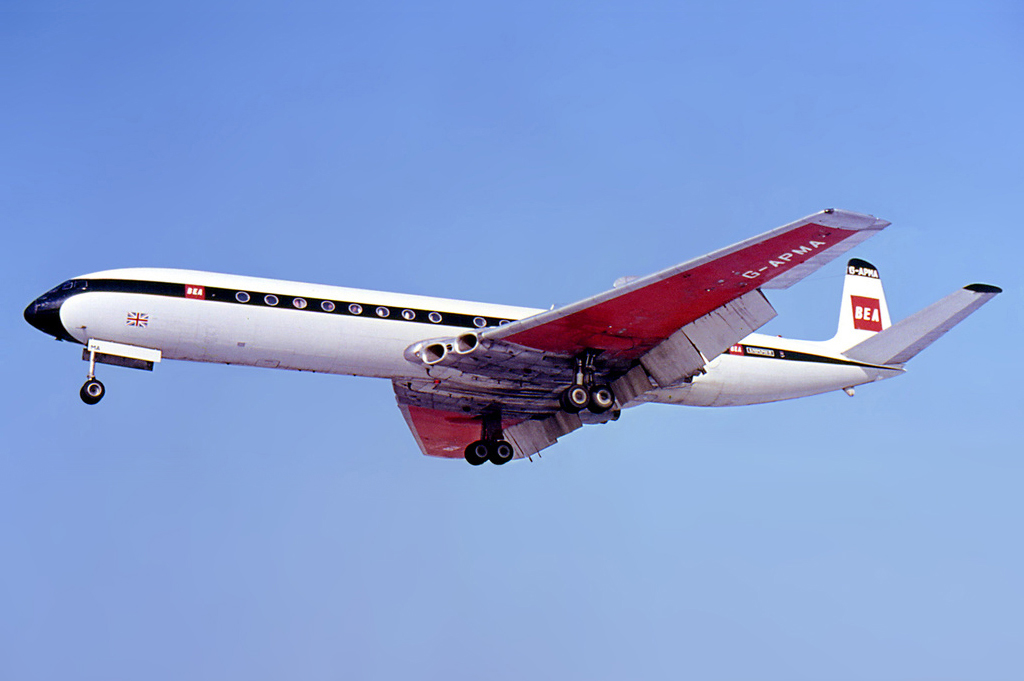
The earliest jet airliner, the de Havilland Comet

Modern jet aircraft have twice the fuel efficiency of the earliest jet airliners. Late 1950s piston airliners like the Lockheed L-1049 Super Constellation and DC-7 were 1% to 28% more energy-intensive than 1990s jet airliners which cruise 40 to 80% faster. The early jet airliners were designed at a time when air crew labor costs were higher relative to fuel costs. Despite the high fuel consumption, because fuel was inexpensive in that era the higher speed resulted in favorable economical returns since crew costs and amortization of capital investment in the aircraft could be spread over more seat-miles flown per day. Productivity including speed went from around 150 ASK/MJ*km/h for the 1930s DC-3 to 550 for the L-1049 in the 1950s, and from 200 for the DH-106 Comet 3 to 900 for the 1990s Boeing 737-800.

Today's turboprop airliners have better fuel-efficiency than current jet airliners, in part because of their propellers. In 2012, turboprop airliner usage was correlated with US regional carriers' fuel efficiency.

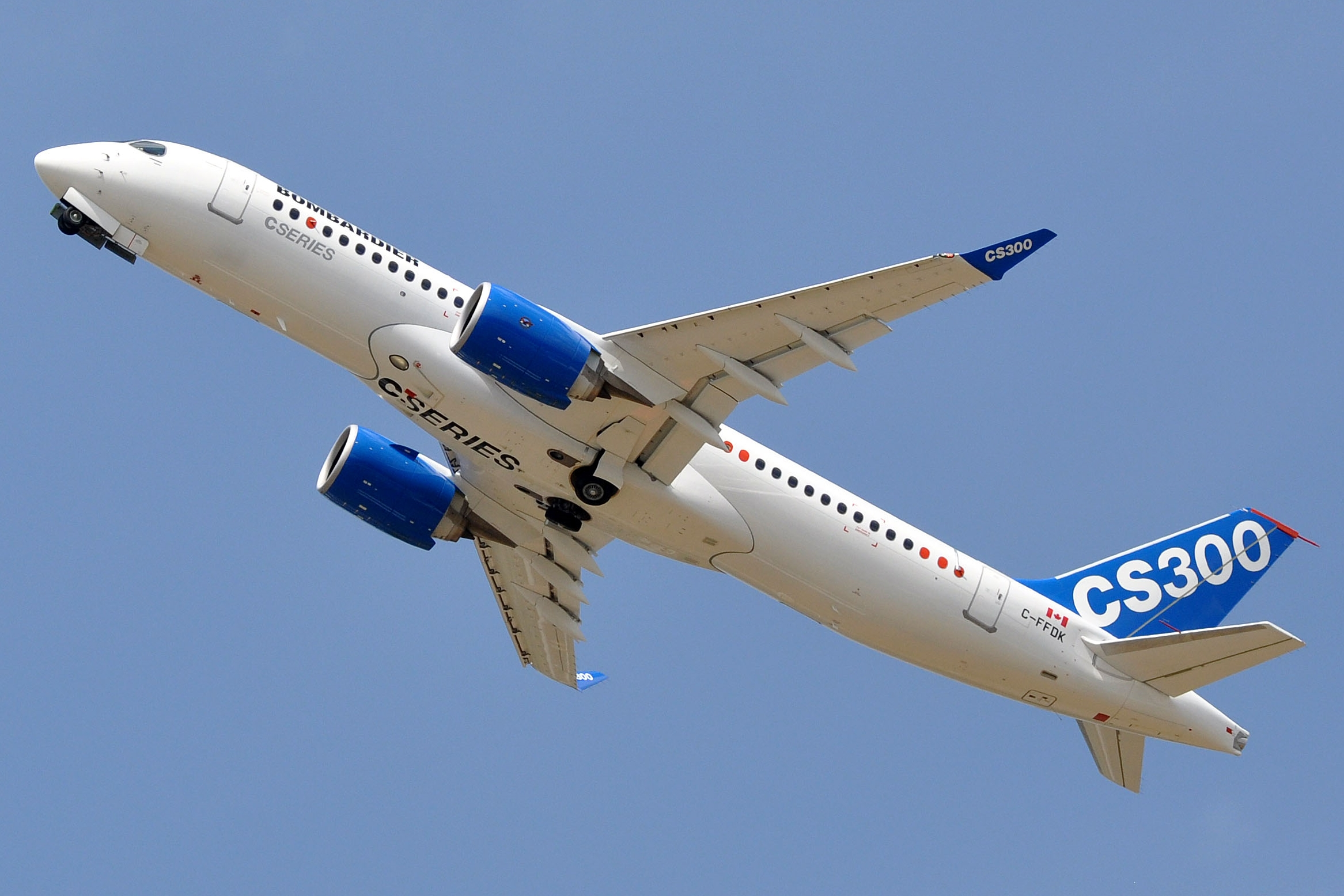
The Airbus A220-300 is the most fuel-efficient, compared with the A319neo and Boeing 737 MAX 7

Jet airliners became 70% more fuel efficient between 1967 and 2007, 40% due to improvements in engine efficiency and 30% from airframes. Efficiency gains were larger early in the jet age than later, with a 55-67% gain from 1960 to 1980 and a 20-26% gain from 1980 to 2000. Average fuel burn of new aircraft fell 45% from 1968 to 2014, a compounded annual reduction 1.3% with variable reduction rate.

Concorde, a supersonic transport, managed about 17 passenger-miles to the Imperial gallon, which is 16.7 L/100 km per passenger; similar to a business jet, but much worse than a subsonic turbofan aircraft. Airbus states a fuel rate consumption of their A380 at less than 3 L/100 km per passenger (78 passenger-miles per US gallon).

Newer aircraft like the Boeing 787 Dreamliner, Airbus A350 and Bombardier CSeries, are 20% more fuel efficient per passenger kilometer than previous generation aircraft. For the 787, this is achieved through more fuel-efficient engines and lighter composite material airframes, and also through more aerodynamic shapes, winglets, more advanced computer systems for optimising routes and aircraft loading. A life-cycle assessment based on the Boeing 787 shows a 20% emission savings compared to conventional aluminium airliners, 14-15% fleet-wide when encompassing a fleet penetration below 100%, while the air travel demand would increase due to lower operating costs.

Lufthansa, when it ordered both, stated the Airbus A350-900 and the Boeing 777X-9 will consume an average of 2.9 L/100 km (81 mpg_{‑US}) per passenger. The Airbus A321 featuring Sharklet wingtip devices consumes 2.2 L/100 km (110 mpg_{‑US}) per person with a 200-seat layout for WOW Air.

Airbus airliners delivered in 2019 had a carbon intensity of 66.6 g of CO_{2} equivalent per passenger-kilometer, improving to 63.5g in 2020.

== Example values ==
The aviation fuel density used is 6.7 lb/USgal or 0.8 kg/L.

=== Commuter flights ===
For flights of 300 nmi (560 km):

Model	First flight	Seats	Fuel burn	Fuel per seat
Antonov An-148 (241 nmi)	2004	89	4.23 kg/km (15.0 lb/mi)	5.95 L/100 km (39.5 mpg_{‑US})
Antonov An-158 (241 nmi)	2010	99	4.34 kg/km (15.4 lb/mi)	5.47 L/100 km (43.0 mpg_{‑US})
ATR 42-500	1995	48	1.26 kg/km (4.5 lb/mi)	3.15 L/100 km (75 mpg_{‑US})
ATR 72-500	1997	72	1.67 kg/km (5.9 lb/mi)	2.89 L/100 km (81 mpg_{‑US})
ATR 72-500	1997	70	1.42 kg/km (5.0 lb/mi)	2.53 L/100 km (93 mpg_{‑US})
ATR 72-600	2010	72	1.56 kg/km (5.5 lb/mi)	2.79 L/100 km (84 mpg_{‑US})
Beechcraft 1900D (226 nm)	1982	19	1.00 kg/km (3.56 lb/mi)	6.57 L/100 km (35.8 mpg_{‑US})
Bombardier CRJ100	1991	50	2.21 kg/km (7.83 lb/mi)	5.50 L/100 km (42.8 mpg_{‑US})
Bombardier CRJ200	1995	50	2.18 kg/km (7.73 lb/mi)	5.43 L/100 km (43.3 mpg_{‑US})
Bombardier CRJ700	1999	70	2.95 kg/km (10.47 lb/mi)	5.25 L/100 km (44.8 mpg_{‑US})
Bombardier CRJ900	2001	88	3.47 kg/km (12.31 lb/mi)	4.91 L/100 km (47.9 mpg_{‑US})
Bombardier Dash 8 Q400	1998	78	2.16 kg/km (7.7 lb/mi)	3.46 L/100 km (68.0 mpg_{‑US})
Dornier 228	1981	19	0.94 kg/km (3.3 lb/mi)	6.22 L/100 km (37.8 mpg_{‑US})
Dornier 328	1991	32	1.22 kg/km (4.3 lb/mi)	4.76 L/100 km (49.4 mpg_{‑US})
Embraer Brasilia	1983	30	0.92 kg/km (3.3 lb/mi)	3.82 L/100 km (61.6 mpg_{‑US})
Embraer ERJ-135ER (309 nmi)	1998	37	1.64 kg/km (5.83 lb/mi)	5.52 L/100 km (42.6 mpg_{‑US})
Embraer ERJ-145ER (305 nmi)	1995	50	1.76 kg/km (6.23 lb/mi)	4.37 L/100 km (53.8 mpg_{‑US})
Saab 340	1983	32	1.1 kg/km (3.9 lb/mi)	4.29 L/100 km (54.8 mpg_{‑US})
Saab 2000	1992	50	1.75 kg/km (6.2 lb/mi)	4.39 L/100 km (53.6 mpg_{‑US})

=== Regional flights ===
For flights of 500–700 nmi (930–1,300 km)

Model	First flight	Seats	Sector	Fuel burn	Fuel efficiency per seat
Airbus A220 100	2013	115	600 nmi (1,100 km)	2.8 kg/km (10.1 lb/mi)	3.07 L/100 km (76.7 mpg_{‑US})
Airbus A220 300	2015	140	600 nmi (1,100 km)	3.10 kg/km (11.01 lb/mi)	2.75 L/100 km (85.6 mpg_{‑US})
Airbus A220-100	2013	125	500 nmi (930 km)	2.57 kg/km (9.1 lb/mi)	2.57 L/100 km (92 mpg_{‑US})
Airbus A220-300	2015	160	500 nmi (930 km)	2.85 kg/km (10.11 lb/mi)	2.23 L/100 km (105 mpg_{‑US})
Airbus A319neo	2015	144	600 nmi (1,100 km)	3.37 kg/km (11.94 lb/mi)	2.92 L/100 km (80.6 mpg_{‑US})
Airbus A319neo	2015	124	660 nmi (1,220 km)	2.82 kg/km (10 lb/mi)	2.82 L/100 km (83.5 mpg_{‑US})
Airbus A320neo	2015	154	660 nmi (1,220 km)	2.79 kg/km (9.9 lb/mi)	2.25 L/100 km (104.7 mpg_{‑US})
Airbus A321neo	2015	192	660 nmi (1,220 km)	3.30 kg/km (11.7 lb/mi)	2.19 L/100 km (107.4 mpg_{‑US})
Antonov An-148	2004	89	684 nmi (1,267 km)	2.89 kg/km (10.3 lb/mi)	4.06 L/100 km (57.9 mpg_{‑US})
Antonov An-158	2010	99	684 nmi (1,267 km)	3 kg/km (11 lb/mi)	3.79 L/100 km (62.1 mpg_{‑US})
ATR 42-600	2010	50	500 nmi (930 km)	1.30 kg/km (4.6 lb/mi)	3.27 L/100 km (72 mpg_{‑US})
ATR 72-600	2010	72	500 nmi (930 km)	1.41 kg/km (5 lb/mi)	2.46 L/100 km (96 mpg_{‑US})
Boeing 737-300	1984	126	507 nmi (939 km)	3.49 kg/km (12.4 lb/mi)	3.46 L/100 km (68 mpg_{‑US})
Boeing 737-600	1998	110	500 nmi (930 km)	3.16 kg/km (11.2 lb/mi)	3.59 L/100 km (65.5 mpg_{‑US})
Boeing 737-700	1997	126	500 nmi (930 km)	3.21 kg/km (11.4 lb/mi)	3.19 L/100 km (74 mpg_{‑US})
Boeing 737 MAX 7	2017	128	660 nmi (1,220 km)	2.85 kg/km (10.1 lb/mi)	2.77 L/100 km (84.8 mpg_{‑US})
Boeing 737 MAX 7	2017	144	600 nmi (1,100 km)	3.39 kg/km (12.01 lb/mi)	2.93 L/100 km (80.2 mpg_{‑US})
Boeing 737-800	1997	162	500 nmi (930 km)	3.59 kg/km (12.7 lb/mi)	2.77 L/100 km (85 mpg_{‑US})
Boeing 737 MAX 8	2017	166	660 nmi (1,220 km)	3.04 kg/km (10.8 lb/mi)	2.28 L/100 km (103.2 mpg_{‑US})
Boeing 737-900ER	2006	180	500 nmi (930 km)	3.83 kg/km (13.6 lb/mi)	2.66 L/100 km (88 mpg_{‑US})
Boeing 737 MAX 9	2017	180	660 nmi (1,220 km)	3.30 kg/km (11.7 lb/mi)	2.28 L/100 km (103 mpg_{‑US})
Boeing 757-200	1982	200	500 nmi (930 km)	4.68 kg/km (16.61 lb/mi)	2.91 L/100 km (80.7 mpg_{‑US})
Boeing 757-300	1998	243	500 nmi (930 km)	5.19 kg/km (18.41 lb/mi)	2.66 L/100 km (88.4 mpg_{‑US})
Bombardier CRJ100	1991	50	577 nmi (1,069 km)	1.87 kg/km (6.65 lb/mi)	4.68 L/100 km (50.3 mpg_{‑US})
Bombardier CRJ200	1995	50	580 nmi (1,070 km)	1.80 kg/km (6.39 lb/mi)	4.49 L/100 km (52.4 mpg_{‑US})
Bombardier CRJ700	1999	70	574 nmi (1,063 km)	2.45 kg/km (8.68 lb/mi)	4.36 L/100 km (54 mpg_{‑US})
Bombardier CRJ900	2001	88	573 nmi (1,061 km)	2.78 kg/km (9.88 lb/mi)	3.94 L/100 km (59.7 mpg_{‑US})
Bombardier CRJ1000	2009	100	500 nmi (930 km)	2.66 kg/km (9.4 lb/mi)	3.33 L/100 km (71 mpg_{‑US})
Bombardier Dash 8 Q400	1998	74	500 nmi (930 km)	2.31 kg/km (8.2 lb/mi)	3.90 L/100 km (60.3 mpg_{‑US})
Bombardier Dash 8 Q400	1998	74	600 nmi (1,100 km)	1.83 kg/km (6.5 lb/mi)	3.09 L/100 km (76 mpg_{‑US})
Dornier 328	1991	31	600 nmi (1,100 km)	1.08 kg/km (3.8 lb/mi)	4.35 L/100 km (54.1 mpg_{‑US})
Embraer E-Jet E2-175	2020	88	600 nmi (1,100 km)	2.44 kg/km (8.64 lb/mi)	3.44 L/100 km (68.3 mpg_{‑US})
Embraer E-Jet E2-190	2018	106	500 nmi (930 km)	2.48 kg/km (8.8 lb/mi)	2.93 L/100 km (80 mpg_{‑US})
Embraer E-Jet E2-190	2018	106	600 nmi (1,100 km)	2.83 kg/km (10.04 lb/mi)	3.32 L/100 km (70.8 mpg_{‑US})
Embraer E-Jet E2-195	2019	132	500 nmi (930 km)	2.62 kg/km (9.3 lb/mi)	2.50 L/100 km (94.1 mpg_{‑US})
Embraer E-Jet E2-195	2019	132	600 nmi (1,100 km)	3.07 kg/km (10.91 lb/mi)	2.90 L/100 km (81 mpg_{‑US})
Embraer E-Jet-170	2002	80	606 nmi (1,122 km)	2.6 kg/km (9.3 lb/mi)	4.08 L/100 km (57.7 mpg_{‑US})
Embraer E-Jet-175	2005	88	605 nmi (1,120 km)	2.80 kg/km (9.95 lb/mi)	3.97 L/100 km (59.3 mpg_{‑US})
Embraer E-Jet-190	2004	114	607 nmi (1,124 km)	3.24 kg/km (11.48 lb/mi)	3.54 L/100 km (66.5 mpg_{‑US})
Embraer E-Jet-195	2004	122	607 nmi (1,124 km)	3.21 kg/km (11.38 lb/mi)	3.28 L/100 km (71.8 mpg_{‑US})
Embraer ERJ-135ER	1998	37	596 nmi (1,104 km)	1.44 kg/km (5.12 lb/mi)	4.86 L/100 km (48.4 mpg_{‑US})
Embraer ERJ-145ER	1996	50	598 nmi (1,107 km)	1.55 kg/km (5.49 lb/mi)	3.86 L/100 km (61 mpg_{‑US})
Pilatus PC-12	1991	9	500 nmi (930 km)	0.41 kg/km (1.5 lb/mi)	5.66 L/100 km (41.6 mpg_{‑US})
Saab 340	1983	31	500 nmi (930 km)	0.95 kg/km (3.4 lb/mi)	3.83 L/100 km (61.4 mpg_{‑US})
Saab 2000	1992	50	500 nmi (930 km)	1.54 kg/km (5.5 lb/mi)	3.85 L/100 km (61.1 mpg_{‑US})
Sukhoi SSJ100	2008	98	500 nmi (930 km)	2.81 kg/km (10.0 lb/mi)	3.59 L/100 km (65.5 mpg_{‑US})

=== Short-haul flights ===
For flights of 1,000 nmi (1,900 km):

Model	First flight	Seats	Fuel Burn	Fuel efficiency per seat
Airbus A220-100	2013	125	2.28 kg/km (8.1 lb/mi)	2.28 L/100 km (103 mpg_{‑US})
Airbus A220-300	2015	135	2.30 kg/km (8.17 lb/mi)	2.13 L/100 km (110 mpg_{‑US})
Airbus A220-300	2015	150	2.42 kg/km (8.6 lb/mi)	2.02 L/100 km (116 mpg_{‑US})
Airbus A220-300	2015	160	2.56 kg/km (9.08 lb/mi)	2.00 L/100 km (118 mpg_{‑US})
Airbus A319	1995	124	2.93 kg/km (10.4 lb/mi)	2.95 L/100 km (80 mpg_{‑US})
Airbus A319neo	2015	136	2.4 kg/km (8.6 lb/mi)	2.22 L/100 km (106 mpg_{‑US})
Airbus A320	1987	150	3.13 kg/km (11.1 lb/mi)	2.61 L/100 km (90 mpg_{‑US})
Airbus A320neo	2016	180	2.79 kg/km (9.9 lb/mi)	1.94 L/100 km (121 mpg_{‑US})
Airbus A321-200	1996	180	3.61 kg/km (12.8 lb/mi)	2.50 L/100 km (94 mpg_{‑US})
Airbus A321neo	2017	220	3.47 kg/km (12.3 lb/mi)	1.98 L/100 km (119 mpg_{‑US})
Airbus A330-200	1997	293	5.6 kg/km (19.8 lb/mi)	2.37 L/100 km (99 mpg_{‑US})
Antonov An-148 (1190 nmi)	2004	89	2.75 kg/km (9.8 lb/mi)	3.86 L/100 km (60.9 mpg_{‑US})
Antonov An-158 (1190 nmi)	2010	99	2.83 kg/km (10.0 lb/mi)	3.57 L/100 km (65.9 mpg_{‑US})
Boeing 737-600	1998	110	2.77 kg/km (9.8 lb/mi)	3.15 L/100 km (75 mpg_{‑US})
Boeing 737-700	1997	126	2.82 kg/km (10.0 lb/mi)	2.79 L/100 km (84 mpg_{‑US})
Boeing 737-700	1997	128	2.8 kg/km (9.9 lb/mi)	2.71 L/100 km (87 mpg_{‑US})
Boeing 737 MAX-7	2017	140	2.51 kg/km (8.91 lb/mi)	1.94 L/100 km (121 mpg_{‑US})
Boeing 737-800	1997	162	3.17 kg/km (11.2 lb/mi)	2.44 L/100 km (96 mpg_{‑US})
Boeing 737-800	1997	160	3.45 kg/km (12.23 lb/mi)	2.68 L/100 km (88 mpg_{‑US})
Boeing 737-800W	1997	162	3.18 kg/km (11.3 lb/mi)	2.45 L/100 km (96 mpg_{‑US})
Boeing 737 MAX-8	2017	162	2.71 kg/km (9.6 lb/mi)	2.04 L/100 km (115 mpg_{‑US})
Boeing 737-900ER	2006	180	3.42 kg/km (12.1 lb/mi)	2.38 L/100 km (99 mpg_{‑US})
Boeing 737-900ERW	2006	180	3.42 kg/km (12.1 lb/mi)	2.37 L/100 km (99 mpg_{‑US})
Boeing 737 MAX-9	2017	180	2.91 kg/km (10.3 lb/mi)	2.02 L/100 km (116 mpg_{‑US})
Boeing 757-200	1982	190	4.60 kg/km (16.33 lb/mi)	3.02 L/100 km (78 mpg_{‑US})
Boeing 757-200	1982	200	4.16 kg/km (14.76 lb/mi)	2.59 L/100 km (90.8 mpg_{‑US})
Boeing 757-300	1998	243	4.68 kg/km (16.62 lb/mi)	2.40 L/100 km (98 mpg_{‑US})
Boeing 787-8	2009	248	5.50 kg/km (19.5 lb/mi)	2.77 L/100 km (85 mpg_{‑US})
Boeing 787-9	2013	296	5.67 kg/km (20.1 lb/mi)	2.39 L/100 km (98 mpg_{‑US})
Boeing 787-10	2017	336	6.09 kg/km (21.6 lb/mi)	2.27 L/100 km (104 mpg_{‑US})
Quest Kodiak	2004	9	0.71 kg/km (2.52 lb/mi)	6.28 L/100 km (37.5 mpg_{‑US})

=== Medium-haul flights ===
For flights around 2,000–3,000 nmi (3,700–5,600 km), transcontinental (e.g. Washington Dulles – Seattle-Tacoma is 2,000 nmi) to short transatlantic flights (e.g. New York JFK – London-Heathrow is 3,000 nmi).

Model	First flight	Seats	Sector	Fuel burn	Fuel per seat
Airbus A220-300	2015	150	2,000 nmi (3,700 km)	2.42 kg/km (8.59 lb/mi)	2.02 L/100 km (116 mpg_{‑US})
Airbus A320	1987	150	2,151 nmi (3,984 km)	2.91 kg/km (10.3 lb/mi)	2.43 L/100 km (97 mpg_{‑US})
Airbus A321LR	2016	154	3,400 nmi (6,300 km)	2.99 kg/km (10.6 lb/mi)	2.43 L/100 km (97 mpg_{‑US})
Airbus A330-200	1997	241	3,000 nmi (5,600 km)	6 kg/km (21 lb/mi)	3.11 L/100 km (76 mpg_{‑US})
Airbus A330-300	1992	262	3,000 nmi (5,600 km)	6.25 kg/km (22.2 lb/mi)	2.98 L/100 km (79 mpg_{‑US})
Airbus A330-900	2016	310	3,350 nmi (6,200 km)	6 kg/km (21 lb/mi)	2.42 L/100 km (97 mpg_{‑US})
Airbus A340-300	1992	262	3,000 nmi (5,600 km)	6.81 kg/km (24.2 lb/mi)	3.25 L/100 km (72 mpg_{‑US})
Airbus A380	2005	544	2,000 nmi (3,700 km)	13.6 kg/km (48.4 lb/mi)	3.14 L/100 km (75 mpg_{‑US})
Boeing 737 MAX-8	2017	168	3,400 nmi (6,300 km)	2.86 kg/km (10.1 lb/mi)	2.13 L/100 km (110 mpg_{‑US})
Boeing 737 MAX-9	2017	144	3,400 nmi (6,300 km)	2.91 kg/km (10.3 lb/mi)	2.53 L/100 km (93 mpg_{‑US})
Boeing 747-400	1988	416	2,151 nmi (3,984 km)	10.77 kg/km (38.2 lb/mi)	3.24 L/100 km (73 mpg_{‑US})
Boeing 747-8	2011	467	3,000 nmi (5,600 km)	9.9 kg/km (35 lb/mi)	2.65 L/100 km (89 mpg_{‑US})
Boeing 757-200W	1981	158	3,400 nmi (6,300 km)	3.79 kg/km (13.4 lb/mi)	3.00 L/100 km (78 mpg_{‑US})
Boeing 767-200ER	1984	181	3,000 nmi (5,600 km)	4.83 kg/km (17.1 lb/mi)	3.34 L/100 km (70 mpg_{‑US})
Boeing 767-200ER	1984	193	3,400 nmi (6,300 km)	5.01 kg/km (17.8 lb/mi)	3.25 L/100 km (72 mpg_{‑US})
Boeing 767-200ER	1984	224	3,000 nmi (5,600 km)	4.93 kg/km (17.5 lb/mi)	2.75 L/100 km (86 mpg_{‑US})
Boeing 767-300ER	1988	218	2,151 nmi (3,984 km)	5.38 kg/km (19.1 lb/mi)	3.09 L/100 km (76 mpg_{‑US})
Boeing 767-300ER	1988	218	3,000 nmi (5,600 km)	5.39 kg/km (19.1 lb/mi)	3.09 L/100 km (76 mpg_{‑US})
Boeing 767-300ER	1988	269	3,000 nmi (5,600 km)	5.51 kg/km (19.5 lb/mi)	2.56 L/100 km (92 mpg_{‑US})
Boeing 767-400ER	1999	245	3,000 nmi (5,600 km)	5.78 kg/km (20.5 lb/mi)	2.95 L/100 km (80 mpg_{‑US})
Boeing 767-400ER	1999	304	3,000 nmi (5,600 km)	5.93 kg/km (21.0 lb/mi)	2.44 L/100 km (96 mpg_{‑US})
Boeing 767-400ER	1999	304	3,265 nmi (6,047 km)	5.92 kg/km (21 lb/mi)	2.43 L/100 km (96.9 mpg_{‑US})
Boeing 777-200	1994	305	3,000 nmi (5,600 km)	6.83 kg/km (24.2 lb/mi)	2.80 L/100 km (84 mpg_{‑US})
Boeing 777-200ER	1996	301	3,000 nmi (5,600 km)	6.96 kg/km (24.7 lb/mi)	2.89 L/100 km (81 mpg_{‑US})
Boeing 777-300	1997	368	3,000 nmi (5,600 km)	7.88 kg/km (28.0 lb/mi)	2.68 L/100 km (88 mpg_{‑US})
Boeing 787-8	2009	291	3,400 nmi (6,300 km)	5.26 kg/km (18.7 lb/mi)	2.26 L/100 km (104 mpg_{‑US})
Boeing 787-8	2009	238	3,400 nmi (6,300 km)	5.11 kg/km (18.1 lb/mi)	2.68 L/100 km (88 mpg_{‑US})
Boeing 787-9	2013	304	3,350 nmi (6,200 km)	5.77 kg/km (20.5 lb/mi)	2.37 L/100 km (99 mpg_{‑US})
Irkut MC-21-300	2017	163	1,750 nmi (3,240 km)	3.04 kg/km (10.8 lb/mi)	2.33 L/100 km (101 mpg_{‑US})

=== Long-haul flights ===
For flights around 5,000 to 7,000 nmi (9,300 to 13,000 km), including transpacific flights (e.g. Hong Kong – San Francisco International is 6,000 nmi).

Model	First flight	Seats	Sector	Fuel burn	Fuel per seat
Airbus A330-200	1997	241	6,000 nmi (11,000 km)	6.4 kg/km (23 lb/mi)	3.32 L/100 km (71 mpg_{‑US})
Airbus A330-200	1997	248	5,549 nmi (10,277 km)	6.55 kg/km (23.2 lb/mi)	3.3 L/100 km (71 mpg_{‑US})
Airbus A330-300	1992	274	5,548 nmi (10,275 km)	6.81 kg/km (24.2 lb/mi)	3.11 L/100 km (76 mpg_{‑US})
Airbus A330-800	2017	248	4,650 nmi (8,610 km)	5.45 kg/km (19.3 lb/mi)	2.75 L/100 km (86 mpg_{‑US})
Airbus A330-900	2017	300	4,650 nmi (8,610 km)	5.94 kg/km (21.1 lb/mi)	2.48 L/100 km (95 mpg_{‑US})
Airbus A340-300	1992	262	6,000 nmi (11,000 km)	7.32 kg/km (26.0 lb/mi)	3.49 L/100 km (67.4 mpg_{‑US})
Airbus A350-900	2013	315	4,972 nmi (9,208 km)	6.03 kg/km (21.4 lb/mi)	2.39 L/100 km (98 mpg_{‑US})
Airbus A350-900	2013	318	5,534 nmi (10,249 km)	6.52 kg/km (23.1 lb/mi)	2.56 L/100 km (92 mpg_{‑US})
Airbus A350-900	2013	315	6,542 nmi (12,116 km)	7.07 kg/km (25.1 lb/mi)	2.81 L/100 km (84 mpg_{‑US})
Airbus A350-1000	2016	327	5,531 nmi (10,243 km)	7.46 kg/km (26.5 lb/mi)	2.85 L/100 km (83 mpg_{‑US})
Airbus A350-1000	2016	367	5,531 nmi (10,243 km)	7.58 kg/km (26.9 lb/mi)	2.58 L/100 km (91 mpg_{‑US})
Airbus A380	2005	525	7,200 nmi (13,300 km)	13.78 kg/km (48.9 lb/mi)	3.27 L/100 km (72 mpg_{‑US})
Airbus A380	2005	544	6,000 nmi (11,000 km)	13.78 kg/km (48.9 lb/mi)	3.16 L/100 km (74 mpg_{‑US})
Boeing 747-400	1988	416	6,000 nmi (11,000 km)	11.11 kg/km (39.4 lb/mi)	3.34 L/100 km (70 mpg_{‑US})
Boeing 747-400	1988	393	5,503 nmi (10,192 km)	11.82 kg/km (41.9 lb/mi)	3.76 L/100 km (62.6 mpg_{‑US})
Boeing 747-400	1988	487	5,479 nmi (10,147 km)	12.31 kg/km (43.7 lb/mi)	3.16 L/100 km (74 mpg_{‑US})
Boeing 747-8	2011	467	6,000 nmi (11,000 km)	10.54 kg/km (37.4 lb/mi)	2.82 L/100 km (83 mpg_{‑US})
Boeing 747-8	2011	405	7,200 nmi (13,300 km)	10.9 kg/km (39 lb/mi)	3.35 L/100 km (70 mpg_{‑US})
Boeing 777-200ER	1996	304	5,535 nmi (10,251 km)	7.57 kg/km (26.9 lb/mi)	3.11 L/100 km (76 mpg_{‑US})
Boeing 777-200ER	1996	301	6,000 nmi (11,000 km)	7.42 kg/km (26.3 lb/mi)	3.08 L/100 km (76 mpg_{‑US})
Boeing 777-200ER	1996	301	6,000 nmi (11,000 km)	7.44 kg/km (26.4 lb/mi)	3.09 L/100 km (76 mpg_{‑US})
Boeing 777-200LR	2005	291	4,972 nmi (9,208 km)	7.57 kg/km (26.9 lb/mi)	3.25 L/100 km (72 mpg_{‑US})
Boeing 777-300ER	2003	382	5,507 nmi (10,199 km)	8.86 kg/km (31.4 lb/mi)	2.9 L/100 km (81 mpg_{‑US})
Boeing 777-300ER	2003	365	6,000 nmi (11,000 km)	8.49 kg/km (30.1 lb/mi)	2.91 L/100 km (81 mpg_{‑US})
Boeing 777-300ER	2003	344	7,200 nmi (13,300 km)	8.58 kg/km (30.4 lb/mi)	3.11 L/100 km (76 mpg_{‑US})
Boeing 777-9X	2020	395	7,200 nmi (13,300 km)	7.69 kg/km (27.3 lb/mi)	2.42 L/100 km (97 mpg_{‑US})
Boeing 787-8	2011	243	4,650 nmi (8,610 km)	5.38 kg/km (19.1 lb/mi)	2.77 L/100 km (85 mpg_{‑US})
Boeing 787-8 GEnx	2011	220	5,537 nmi (10,255 km)	5.3 kg/km (19 lb/mi)	3.01 L/100 km (78 mpg_{‑US})
Boeing 787-8 Trent	2011	220	5,537 nmi (10,255 km)	5.51 kg/km (19.5 lb/mi)	3.13 L/100 km (75 mpg_{‑US})
Boeing 787-9 GEnx	2013	294	4,650 nmi (8,610 km)	5.85 kg/km (20.8 lb/mi)	2.49 L/100 km (94 mpg_{‑US})
Boeing 787-9	2013	304	4,972 nmi (9,208 km)	5.63 kg/km (20.0 lb/mi)	2.31 L/100 km (102 mpg_{‑US})
Boeing 787-9 GEnx	2013	266	5,534 nmi (10,249 km)	5.62 kg/km (19.9 lb/mi)	2.64 L/100 km (89 mpg_{‑US})
Boeing 787-9	2013	291	6,542 nmi (12,116 km)	7.18 kg/km (25.5 lb/mi)	3.08 L/100 km (76 mpg_{‑US})
Boeing 787-10 GEnx	2017	337	5,529 nmi (10,240 km)	6.12 kg/km (21.7 lb/mi)	2.27 L/100 km (104 mpg_{‑US})
Boeing 787-10 Trent	2017	337	5,529 nmi (10,240 km)	6.24 kg/km (22.1 lb/mi)	2.31 L/100 km (102 mpg_{‑US})

For a comparison with ground transportation - much slower and with shorter range than air travel - a Volvo bus 9700 averages 0.41 L/100 km (570 mpg_{‑US}) per seat for 63 seats. In highway travel an average auto has the potential for 1.61 L/100 km (146 mpg_{‑US}) per seat (assuming 4 seats) and for a 5-seat 2014 Toyota Prius, 0.98 L/100 km (240 mpg_{‑US}). While this shows the capabilities of the vehicles, the load factors (percentage of seats occupied) may differ between personal use (commonly just the driver in the car) and societal averages for long-distance auto use, and among those of particular airlines.

=== General aviation ===
For private aircraft in general aviation, current FAI Aeroplane Efficiency records are :

- 33.92 km/kg fuel or 3.9 L/100 km in a Aeroprakt-40 two seater for 300– 500 kg MTOW airplanes (C-1a class) (1.95 L/100 km per seat).
- 37.22 km/kg fuel or 3.56 L/100 km in a Monnett Sonerai single-seat racer for 500-1,000 kg MTOW airplanes(C-1b class)
- 9.19 km/kg or 13.6 L/100 km in a four-seat diesel-powered Cessna 182 for 1,000-1,750 kg MTOW airplanes (C-1c class) (3.4 L/100 km per seat).
- 3.08 km/kg or 40.6 L/100 km in a Cirrus SF50 seven-seat jet for 1.75-3 t MTOW airplanes (C-1d class) (5.8 L/100 km per seat).

A four-seat Dyn'Aéro MCR4S powered by a Rotax 914 consumes 8.3 L/100 km at 264 km/h (2.1 L/100 km per seat).

=== Business aircraft ===
Hourly Fuel Burn for Private Aircraft
Type	Aircraft	US gal	L	lb	kg
Turboprops	Pilatus PC12 (Note: Average)	66	250	442	200
Turboprops	Cessna Grand Caravan EX (Note: Cruise)	58	220	390	177
Turboprops	King Air 350	100	379	670	304
Light Jets	Cessna Citation M2	137–104	519–394	918–697	416–316
Light Jets	Embraer Phenom 100 (Note: 1st hour-2nd hour)	109–77	413–291	730–516	331–234
Light Jets	Cessna Citation CJ3+ (Note: Average-Cruise)	124–116	469–439	830–780	376–354
Light Jets	Embraer Phenom 300	166–115	628–435	1,112–770	504–349
Light Jets	Learjet 70/75	239–179	905–678	1,600–1,200	726–544
Mid-Size Jets	Bombardier Challenger 300	266	1,007	1,782	808
Mid-Size Jets	Gulfstream G200	233	882	1,561	708
Mid-Size Jets	Hawker 900XP	257	973	1,722	781
Mid-Size Jets	Cessna Citation X+	336	1,272	2,251	1,021
Mid-Size Jets	Dassault Falcon 7X	318	1,204	2,130	966
Long-Range Jets	Gulfstream G550	672–447	2,544–1,692	4,500–3,000	2,041–1,361
Long-Range Jets	Bombardier Global 6000	512–486	1,938–1,840	3,430–3,256	1,556–1,477
Long-Range Jets	Airbus ACJ319	640	2,423	4,288	1,945

== Future ==
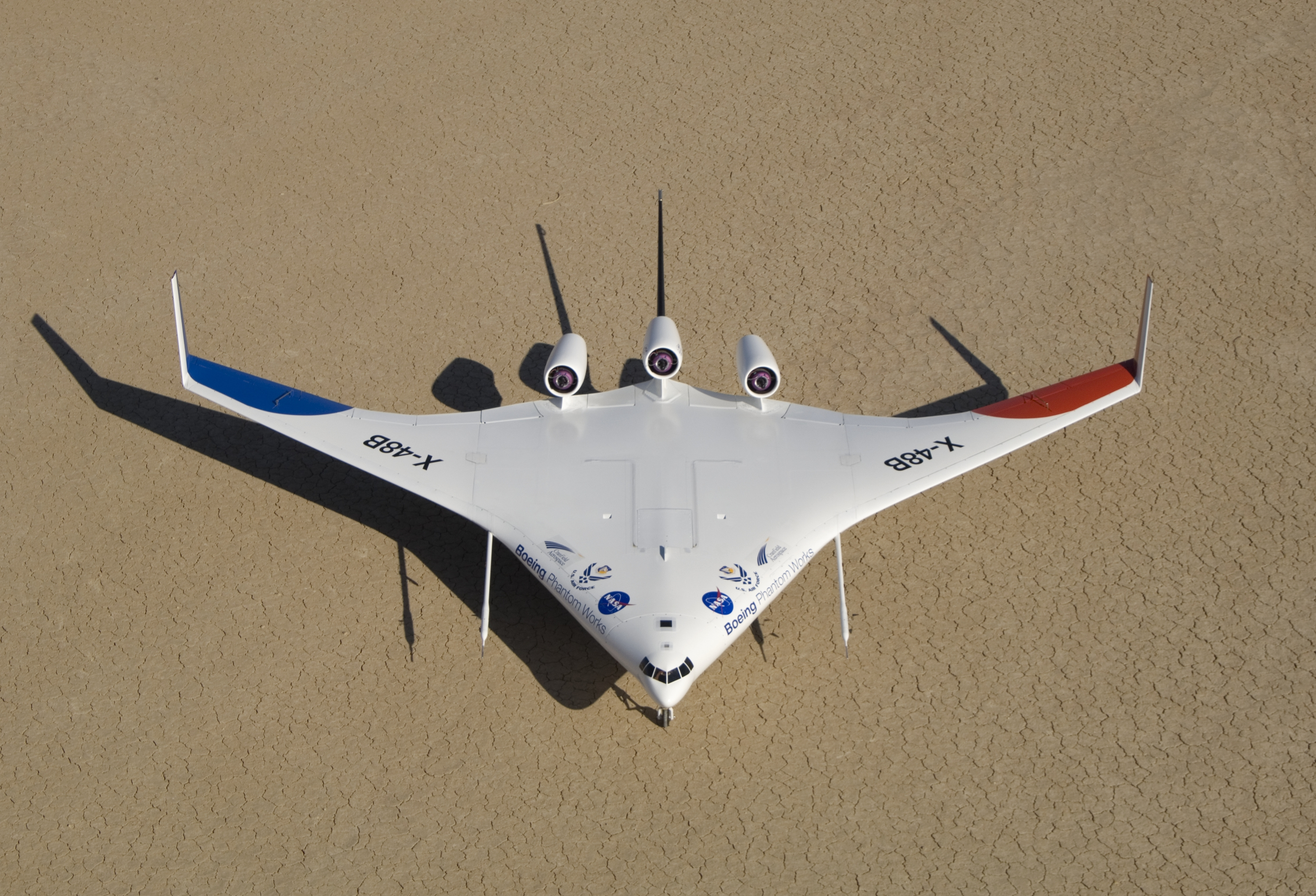
Boeing/NASA's X-48B blended wing body demonstrator

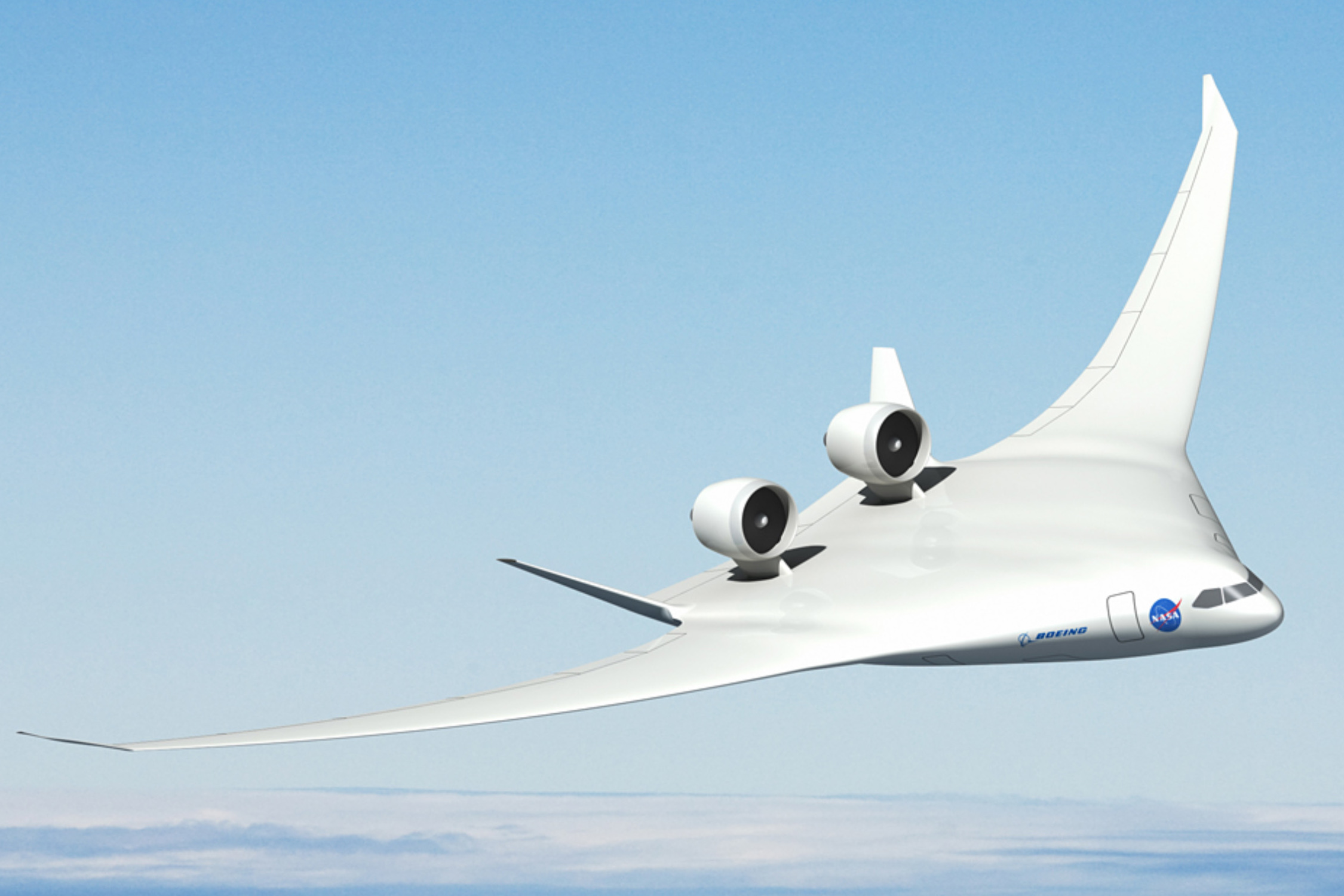
Boeing's blended wing body concept

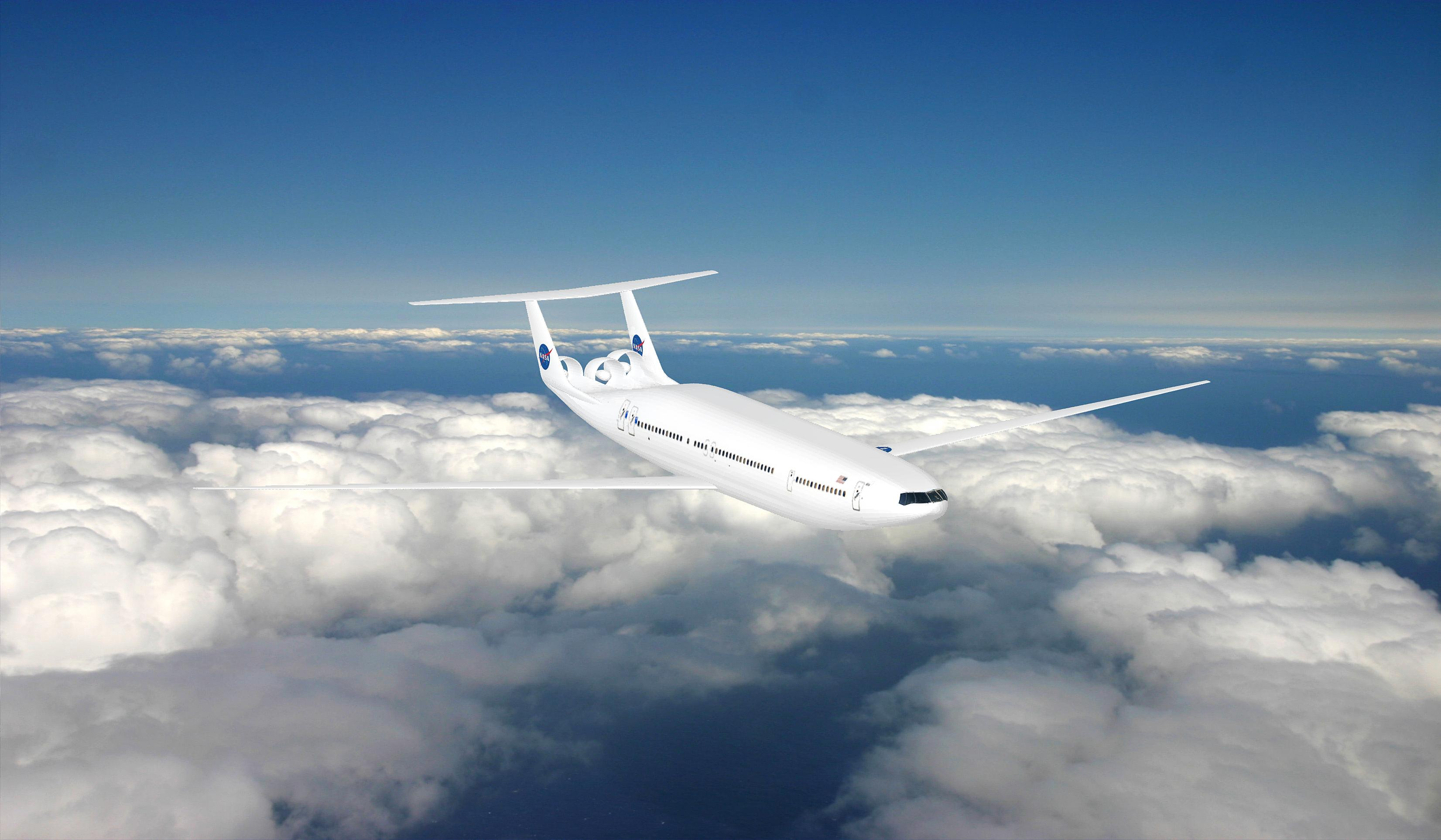
NASA / Aurora Flight Sciences D8 airliner concept

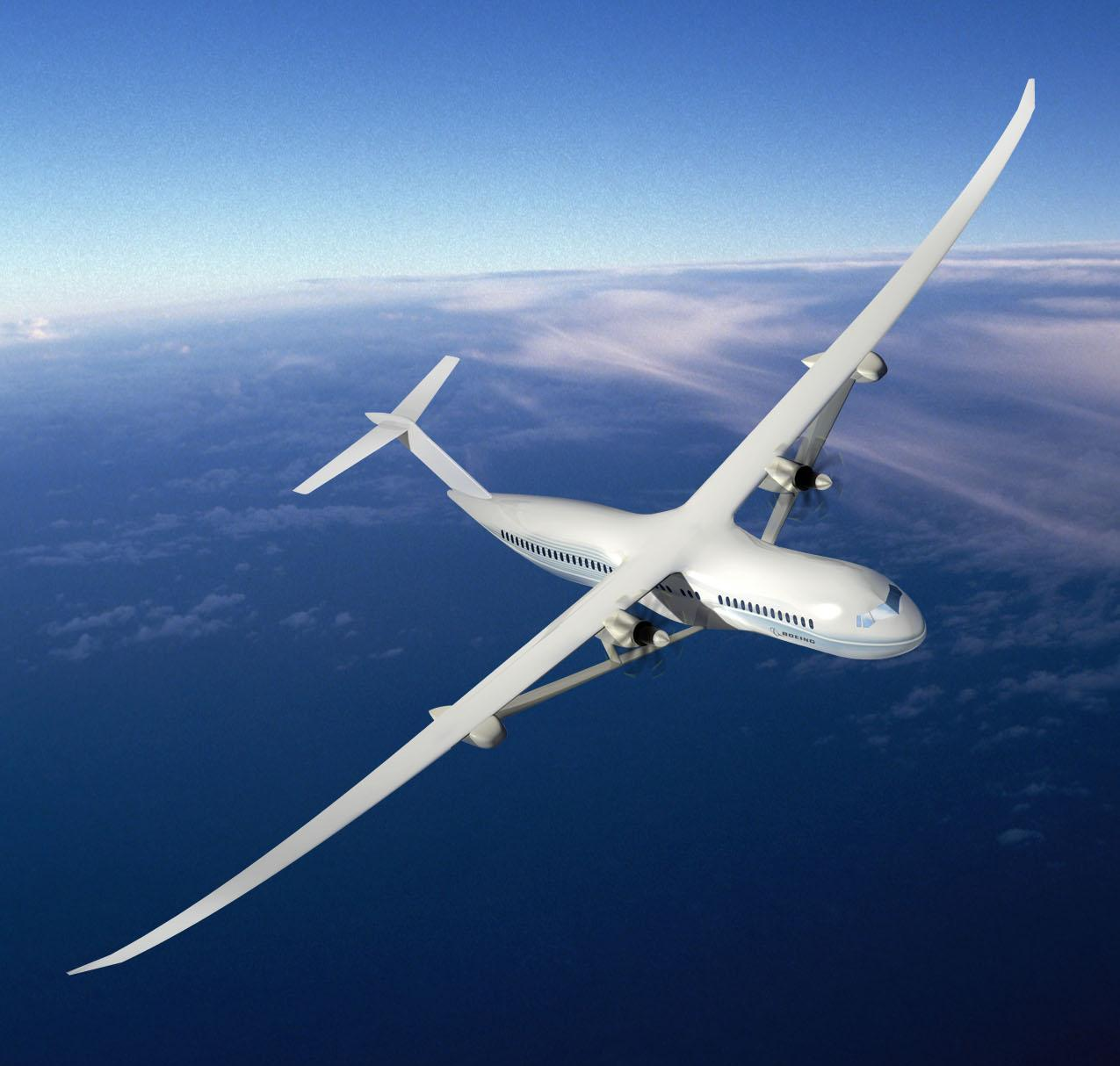
Boeing Volt truss-braced wing concept

NASA and Boeing flight-tested a 500 lb (230 kg) blended wing body (BWB) X-48B demonstrator from August 2012 to April 2013. This design provides greater fuel efficiency, since the whole craft produces lift, not just the wings. The BWB concept offers advantages in structural, aerodynamic and operating efficiencies over today's more-conventional fuselage-and-wing designs. These features translate into greater range, fuel economy, reliability and life-cycle savings, as well as lower manufacturing costs. NASA has created a cruise efficient STOL (CESTOL) concept.

Fraunhofer Institute for Manufacturing Engineering and Applied Materials Research (IFAM) have researched a sharkskin-imitating paint that would reduce drag through a riblet effect. Aviation is a major potential application for new technologies such as aluminium metal foam and nanotechnology.

The International Air Transport Association (IATA) technology roadmap envisions improvements in aircraft configuration and aerodynamics. It projects the following reductions in engine fuel consumption, compared to baseline aircraft in service in 2015:

- 10-15% from higher pressure and bypass ratios, lighter materials, implemented in 2010–2019
- 20-25% from high pressure core + ultra-high by-pass ratio geared turbofan, from ~2020-25
- 30% from open rotors (propfans), from ~2030
- 40-80% from hybrid electric propulsion (depending on battery use), from ~2030-40
- up to 100% due to Fully electric propulsion (primary energy from renewable source), from ~2035-40.

Moreover, it projects the following gains for aircraft design technologies:

- 6 to 12% from airframe retrofits (winglets, riblets, lightweight cabin furnishing) currently available
- 4 to 10% from materials and Structure (composite structure, adjustable landing gear, fly-by-wire) also currently available
- 1 to 4% from electric taxiing from 2020+
- 5 to 15% from advanced aerodynamics (hybrid/natural laminar flow, variable camber, spiroid wingtip) from 2020–25
- 30% from strut-braced wings (with advanced turbofan engines, ~2030-35)
- 35% from a double bubble fuselage like the Aurora D8 (with advanced turbofan engines, ~2035)
- 30-35% from a box/joined closed wing (with advanced turbofan engines, ~2035-40)
- 27 to 50% from a blended wing body design (with hybrid propulsion, ~2040)
- Up to 100% with fully electric aircraft (short range, ~2035-45)

Today's tube-and-wing configuration could remain in use until the 2030s due to drag reductions from active flutter suppression for slender flexible-wings and natural and hybrid laminar flow. Large, ultra high bypass engines will need upswept gull wings or overwing nacelles as Pratt & Whitney continue to develop their geared turbofan to save a projected 10–15% of fuel costs by the mid-2020s. NASA indicates this configuration could gain up to 45% with advanced aerodynamics, structures and geared turbofans, but longer term suggests savings of up to 50% by 2025 and 60% by 2030 with new ultra-efficient configurations and propulsion architectures: hybrid wing body, truss-braced wing, lifting body designs, embedded engines, and boundary-layer ingestion. By 2030 hybrid-electric architectures may be ready for 100 seaters and distributed propulsion with tighter integration of airframe may enable further efficiency and emissions improvements.

Research projects such as Boeing's ecoDemonstrator program have sought to identify ways of improving the fuel economy of commercial aircraft operations. The U.S. government has encouraged such research through grant programs, including the FAA's Continuous Lower Energy, Emissions and Noise (CLEEN) program, and NASA's Environmentally Responsible Aviation (ERA) Project.

Multiple concepts are projected to reduce fuel consumption:

- the Airbus/Rolls-Royce E-Thrust is a hybrid electric with a gas turbine engine and electric ducted fans with energy storage allowing peak power for takeoff and climb while for the descent the engine is shut down and the fans recover energy to recharge the batteries;
- Empirical Systems Aerospace (ESAero) is developing the 150-seat ECO-150 concept for turboelectric distributed propulsion with two turboshaft engines mounted on the wing and driving generators powering ducted fans embedded in the inboard wing sections, effectively increasing the bypass ratio and propulsive efficiency for 20–30% fuel savings over the Boeing 737 NG, while providing some powered lift;
- NASA's single-aisle turbo-electric aircraft with an aft boundary layer propulsor (STARC-ABL) is a conventional tube-and-wing 737-sized airliner with an aft-mounted electric fan ingesting the fuselage boundary layer hybrid-electric propulsion, with 5.4 MW of power distributed to three electric motors: the design will be evaluated by Aurora Flight Sciences;
- The Boeing blended wing body (BWB) with a wide fuselage mated to high-aspect-ratio wings is more aerodynamically efficient because the entire aircraft contributes to the lift and it has less surface area, producing less drag and offering weight savings due to lower wing loading, while noise is shielded by locating the engines on the aft upper surface;
- Developed with the U.S. Air Force Research Laboratory and refined with NASA, the Lockheed Martin Hybrid Wing Body (HWB) combines a blended forward fuselage and wing with a conventional aft fuselage and T-tail for compatibility with existing infrastructure and airdrop; the engines in overwing nacelles on struts over the trailing edge enable higher-bypass-ratio engines with 5% less drag, provide acoustic shielding and increases lift without a thrust or drag penalty at low speed;
- Airbus-backed German Bauhaus-Luftfahrt designed the Propulsive Fuselage concept, reducing drag with a fan in the tail ingesting air flowing over the fuselage via an annular (ring-shaped) inlet and re-energizes the wake, driven with a gearbox or as a turbo-electric configuration;
- Conceived by the Massachusetts Institute of Technology for NASA, Aurora Flight Sciences developed the "double-bubble" D8, a 180-seat aircraft with a wide lifting fuselage, twin-aisle cabin to replace A320 and B737 narrowbodies, and boundary-layer ingestion with engines in the tail driving distortion-tolerant fans for a 49% fuel-burn reduction over the B737NG;
- The Boeing truss-braced wing (TBW) concept was developed for the NASA-funded Subsonic Ultra Green Aircraft Research program with an aspect ratio of 19.5 compared to 11 for the Boeing 787: the strut relieves some bending moment and a braced wing can be lighter than a cantilevered wing or longer for the same weight, having better lift-to-drag ratio by lowering the induced drag and thinner, facilitating natural laminar flow and reducing wave drag at transonic speeds;
- Dzyne Technologies reduces the thickness of the blended wing body for a 110–130-seat super-regional, a configuration usually too thick for a narrowbody replacement and better suited for large aircraft, by placing the landing gear outward and storing baggage in the wing roots, enabling 20% fuel savings;
- the French research agency ONERA designed two concepts for a 180-seat airliner Versatile Aircraft (NOVA) including turbofans with higher bypass ratios and fan diameter: a gull wing with increased dihedral inboard to accommodate larger geared turbofans under without lengthening the gear and the other with engines embedded in the tail to ingest the low-energy fuselage boundary layer flow and re-energize the wake to reduce drag;
- with Cranfield University, Rolls-Royce developed the Distributed Open Rotor (DORA) with high-aspect-ratio wing and V-tail to minimize drag, and turbogenerators on the wing driving electric propellers along the inboard leading edge with open rotor high-propulsive efficiency and increasing the effective bypass ratio.

== Climate change ==
The growth of air travel outpaces its fuel-economy improvements and corresponding CO_{2} emissions, compromising climate sustainability. Although low-cost carriers' higher seat-density increases fuel economy and lowers greenhouse gas emissions per-passenger-kilometer, the lower airfares cause a rebound effect of more flights and larger overall emissions. The tourism industry could shift emphasis to emissions eco-efficiency in CO_{2} per unit of revenue or profit instead of fuel economy, favoring shorter trips and ground transportation over flying long journeys to reduce greenhouse gas emissions.

== See also ==
- Energy efficiency in transport
- Range (aeronautics)
