= WheelTug =

System by which airplanes can taxi themselves without a tow

- Industry: Aerospace
- Headquarters: Isle of Man
- Key people: Isaiah Cox (CEO); Jack France (Director of Manufacturing)
- Website: wheeltug.com

WheelTug is a company known for its in-wheel electric taxiing system for airplanes. They are headquartered in the Isle of Man and have manufacturing facilities in Baltimore, Maryland.

== Technology ==
The WheelTug system enables airplanes to taxi forward and backwards without needing a tow tractor or using main jet engines. The system uses twin electric motors installed in the rims of the nose wheels. These motors are powered by the aircraft's Auxiliary Power Unit (APU). According to Aviation Week, the WheelTug system is projected to provide savings in ground turnaround time and increased aircraft utilization.

In June 2005 Chorus Motors first ground tested the WheelTug concept on an ex-Air Canada Boeing 767 at the Evergreen Air Center at Pinal Airpark Aircraft boneyard in Marana, Arizona, with an electric motor attached to the nose wheel for taxi testing. Delta Air Lines issued a press release in 2007 that Delta would become a development partner and launch customer for WheelTug expecting installation of first production units on Delta's Boeing 737s by late 2009. According to a Wheeltug press release, roller tests were conducted at Prague Airport in November 2010 in snowy and icy conditions, and the first fully 'in-wheel' demonstration unit was tested there June 2012. In December 2016 the FAA accepted the company's Supplemental Type Certification (STC) plan for the Boeing 737 Next Generation models.

As of January 2017 Wheeltug claims that more than 20 commercial airlines accepted optional production slots over the years. CEO Isaiah Cox states that he hoped WheelTug would enter service for the 737NG when the certification process was expected to be complete in late 2018, with Canadian carrier Air Transat as the launch customer. In September 2020 Cox said that the system would be in production and certified in late 2021 and also claimed that Wheeltug had become so popular that it is expected to be added to a future release of Microsoft Flight Simulator. Cox said the main obstacles to adoption are the difficulty of renegotiating contracts with labor unions and aircraft manufacturers, Airbus and former Wheeltug development partner Boeing, who "actively discourage airlines from trying WheelTug" as he claims leasing a WheelTug unit can make older aircraft useful again without needing to purchase newly manufactured aircraft.

In a may 2024 interview CEO Cox stated the company is still two thirds of the way towards acquiring US FAA certification and hopes to be installed and in use on airliners around the beginning of 2026.

== Marketplace ==
TaxiBot, a semi-robotic towbar-less tractor which drives to meet and moves the unmodified aircraft, is the only current alternative E-Taxiing system certified and in use. TaxiBot can tow aircraft from the gate to the takeoff point.

A direct competitor, previously under development by EGTS International (a joint venture between Honeywell and Safran), sought to install ground taxi motors in the main landing gear wheels. The partnership was dissolved due to the new economics imposed by the sharp drop in the price of jet fuel. Safran continued to work on a main landing gear drive for Airbus until 2019, when Airbus signaled dissatisfaction with the economic trade-offs.
