= EGTS =

Electric powered onboard system for taxiing aircraft

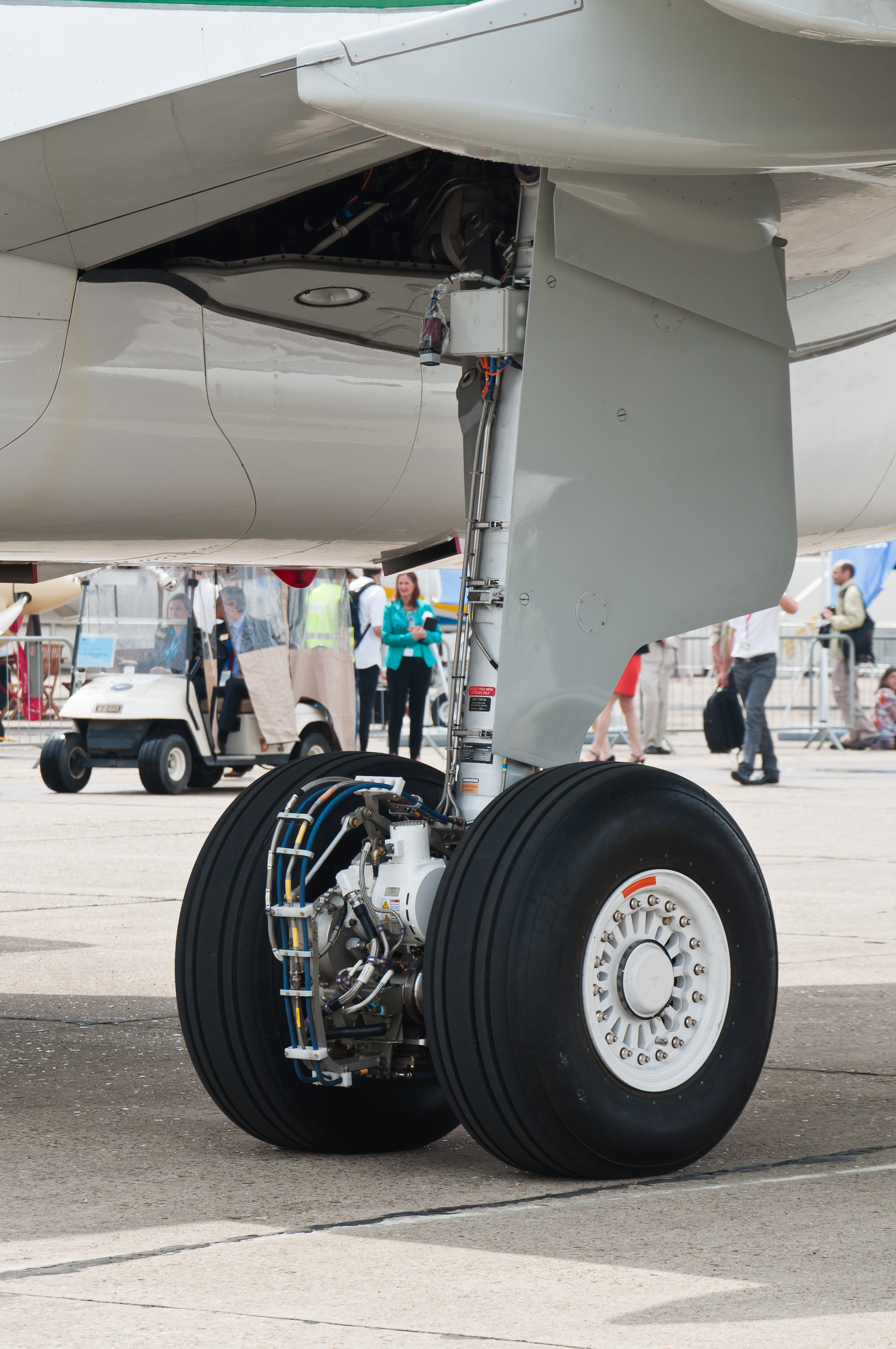
Safran Honeywell EGTS installed on an Airbus A320

An Electric Green Taxiing System (EGTS) is an electric taxiing system which allows aircraft to taxi and pushback without requiring the use of aircraft engines or a pushback tractor, and is designed to reduce fuel volumes used by aircraft and reduce greenhouse gas emissions during ground operations. EGTS technology enables aircraft to avoid using their main engines during taxiing and instead taxi autonomously under their own electrical power, using the Auxiliary Power Unit (APU) generator. The system is designed for single-aisle aircraft, such as the Airbus A320 and the Boeing 737.

Safran began to design its electric taxiing system in the early 2010s as a retrofit, weighing 450 kg (1,000 lb). In 2013, a Safran/Honeywell joint venture demonstrated An Airbus A320 taxiing with engine covers at the Paris Air Show, but Honeywell left by 2016. In 2017, Airbus authorized marketing the system on the A320, but left the program in 2019. By 2022, Safran was designing an integrated, lighter system as original equipment for new programs.

== Design ==
EGTS is an electric taxiing system enabling an aircraft to taxi independently of its main engines or tug.

Each of the two main landing gear inboard wheels is driven by an electric motor powered by the auxiliary power unit (APU) generator, allowing the aircraft to push back from the gate without an airport tug and to taxi without the use of the main engines. An electronic Pilot Interface Unit enables pilot selection of speed, forward or reverse via the EGTS controller if traction is required. The Wheel Actuator Controller Unit (WACU) interprets the pilot's commands through the controller to provide the appropriate, proportional torque at each wheel. The system reduces operating costs by minimising the need to use jet engines which are inefficient on the ground and eliminating the cost and dependence on availability of airport tugs. It can also reduce foreign object damage and reduces carbon and other emissions.

The 300 kilograms (660 lb) system is permanently installed on the aircraft. and can taxi at up to 20 knots (37 km/h; 23 mph).

For the Safran integrated EGTS, a 50 kW (67 hp) motor within main landing gear wheels provides a fuel burn reduction of 4% over a flight cycle.

== Development ==
A patent for electric taxiing was applied for by Delos Aerospace in 2003, and published in 2006.

Honeywell and SAFRAN announced their joint venture EGTS International at the Paris Air Show in 2011.

In 2012, easyJet, in collaboration with Honeywell and Safran, announced that it would be the first airline to support the development and trial of the electric green taxiing system (EGTS).

Following the initial phase of ground testing and first move in April 2013, the system was first demonstrated at the Paris Air Show 2013.

In June 2013, Air France announced its support of the development of the EGTS taxiing system.

In December 2013, Airbus signed a memorandum of understanding (MoU) with EGTS International to further develop and evaluate EGTS for the A320 Family.

In March 2014, Honeywell and Safran signed a Memorandum of Understanding with GoAir to support the advancement of the EGTS taxiing system. GoAir will test the system and supply operational data to have an accurate projection of fuel saving to potential customers.

In April 2014, Mexican airline Interjet became the first North American airline to announce its support for the advancement of the EGTS taxiing system,

At Farnborough Air Show in July 2016, while the development was successful and customers were interested, Honeywell terminated its joint venture with Safran with low oil prices sapping its market but Safran will continue to work on taxiing systems as system design was completed while its A320 demonstrator had been decommissioned since 2013.

In July 2017, to promote it in China, Safran signed a Memorandum of Understanding with a subsidiary of China Aviation Supplies.

== Competition ==
Competitor Taxibot is the only certified and operational alternative taxiing system in the market; it is a semi-robotic tractor that meets the aircraft for taxi-in and taxi-out, once connected it is controlled by the pilot. Competing products in development by WheelTug are different as they are installed on the nose gear.

In 2011, L-3 Communications trialled a similar main landing gear electric taxiing system on an A320 non-flyable demonstrator with Lufthansa Technik and others, and proposed to develop the eTaxi system with Crane Aerospace but abandoned its plans in 2013 due to high investment costs. Another competitor is WheelTug, whose patent describes it as a drive motor inside the nose wheels. In May 2024, the company reported that it was two-thirds of the way towards US FAA certification, aiming for commercial operations in early 2026.
