= STARC-ABL =

Single-aisle Turboelectric Aircraft with an Aft Boundary-Layer propulsor

The Single-aisle Turboelectric Aircraft with an Aft Boundary-Layer propulsor or "STARC-ABL" is an aircraft design developed by NASA in 2017. The design places the engine in the back of the aircraft, and is specifically designed to be more fuel efficient than aircraft designs of the past.
