= Propulsive efficiency =

Measure of efficiency in aerospace engineering

In aerospace engineering, concerning aircraft, rocket and spacecraft design, overall propulsion system efficiency $\eta$ is the efficiency with which the energy contained in a vehicle's fuel is converted into kinetic energy of the vehicle, to accelerate it, or to replace losses due to aerodynamic drag or gravity. Mathematically, it is represented as $\eta = \eta_\mathrm{c} \eta_\mathrm{p}$, where $\eta_\mathrm{c}$ is the cycle efficiency and $\eta_\mathrm{p}$ is the propulsive efficiency.

The cycle efficiency is expressed as the percentage of the heat energy in the fuel that is converted to mechanical energy in the engine, and the propulsive efficiency is expressed as the proportion of the mechanical energy actually used to propel the aircraft. The propulsive efficiency is always less than one, because conservation of momentum requires that the exhaust have some of the kinetic energy, and the propulsive mechanism (whether propeller, jet exhaust, or ducted fan) is never perfectly efficient. It is greatly dependent on exhaust expulsion velocity and airspeed.

== Cycle efficiency ==
Most aerospace vehicles are propelled by heat engines of some kind, usually an internal combustion engine. The efficiency of a heat engine relates how much useful work is output for a given amount of heat energy input.

From the laws of thermodynamics:

$$dW \ = \ dQ_\mathrm{c} \ - \ (-dQ_\mathrm{h})$$

where

$dW = -PdV$ is the work extracted from the engine. (It is negative because work is done by the engine.)
$dQ_\mathrm{h} = T_\mathrm{h}dS_\mathrm{h}$ is the heat energy taken from the high-temperature system (heat source). (It is negative because heat is extracted from the source, hence $(-dQ_\mathrm{h})$ is positive.)
$dQ_\mathrm{c} = T_\mathrm{c}dS_\mathrm{c}$ is the heat energy delivered to the low-temperature system (heat sink). (It is positive because heat is added to the sink.)

In other words, a heat engine absorbs heat from some heat source, converting part of it to useful work, and delivering the rest to a heat sink at lower temperature. In an engine, efficiency is defined as the ratio of useful work done to energy expended.

$$\eta_\mathrm{c} = \frac{-dW}{-dQ_\mathrm{h}} = \frac{-dQ_\mathrm{h} - dQ_\mathrm{c}}{-dQ_\mathrm{h}} = 1 - \frac{dQ_\mathrm{c}}{-dQ_\mathrm{h}}$$

The theoretical maximum efficiency of a heat engine, the Carnot efficiency, depends only on its operating temperatures. Mathematically, this is because in reversible processes, the cold reservoir would gain the same amount of entropy as that lost by the hot reservoir (i.e., $dS_\mathrm{c} = -dS_\mathrm{h}$), for no change in entropy. Thus:

$$\eta_\text{cmax} = 1 - \frac{T_\mathrm{c}dS_\mathrm{c}}{-T_\mathrm{h}dS_\mathrm{h}} = 1 - \frac{T_\mathrm{c}}{T_\mathrm{h}}$$

where $T_\mathrm{h}$ is the absolute temperature of the hot source and $T_\mathrm{c}$ that of the cold sink, usually measured in kelvins. Note that $dS_\mathrm{c}$ is positive while $dS_\mathrm{h}$ is negative; in any reversible work-extracting process, entropy is overall not increased, but rather is moved from a hot (high-entropy) system to a cold (low-entropy one), decreasing the entropy of the heat source and increasing that of the heat sink.

== Propulsive efficiency ==
Propulsive efficiency is defined as the ratio of propulsive power (i.e. thrust times velocity of the vehicle) to work done on the fluid. In generic terms, the propulsive power can be calculated as follows:

$P_\mathrm{prop} = T \times v_{\infty}$

where $T$ represents thrust and $v_{\infty}$, the flight speed.

The thrust can be computed from intake and exhaust massflows ($\dot{m}_\mathrm{in}$ and $\dot{m}_\mathrm{exh}$) and velocities ($v_\mathrm{in}$ and $v_\mathrm{exh}$):

$$T = \dot{m}_\mathrm{exh} v_\mathrm{exh} - \dot{m}_\mathrm{in} v_\mathrm{in}$$
$$P_\mathrm{prop} = \left( \dot{m}_\mathrm{exh} v_\mathrm{exh} - \dot{m}_\mathrm{in} v_\mathrm{in} \right) v_{\infty}$$

The work done by the engine to the flow, on the other hand, is the change in kinetic energy per time. This does not take into account the efficiency of the engine used to generate the power, nor of the propeller, fan or other mechanism used to accelerate air. It merely refers to the work done to the flow, by any means, and can be expressed as the difference between exhausted kinetic energy flux and incoming kinetic energy flux:

$$P_\mathrm{eng} = \frac{1}{2}\dot{m}_\mathrm{exh} v^2_\mathrm{exh} - \frac{1}{2}\dot{m}_\mathrm{in} v^2_\mathrm{in}$$
$$P_\mathrm{eng} = \frac{1}{2}\left(\dot{m}_\mathrm{exh} v^2_\mathrm{exh} - \dot{m}_\mathrm{in} v^2_\mathrm{in}\right)$$

The propulsive efficiency can therefore be computed as:

$$\eta_\mathrm{p} = \frac{P_\mathrm{prop}}{P_\mathrm{eng}} = 2 v_{\infty}
\frac{\dot{m}_\mathrm{exh} v_\mathrm{exh} - \dot{m}_\mathrm{in} v_\mathrm{in}}
{\dot{m}_\mathrm{exh} v^2_\mathrm{exh} - \dot{m}_\mathrm{in} v^2_\mathrm{in}}$$

Depending on the type of propulsion used, this equation can be simplified in different ways, demonstrating some of the peculiarities of different engine types. The general equation already shows, however, that propulsive efficiency improves when using large massflows and small velocities compared to small mass-flows and large velocities, since the squared terms in the denominator grow faster than the non-squared terms.

The losses modelled by propulsive efficiency are explained by the fact that any mode of aero propulsion leaves behind a jet moving into the opposite direction of the vehicle. The kinetic energy flux in this jet is $P_\mathrm{jet} = 1/2 \left( \dot{m}_\mathrm{exh} v^2_\mathrm{exh} - \dot{m}_\mathrm{in} v^2_\mathrm{in} \right) = P_\mathrm{eng} - P_\mathrm{prop}$ for the case that $v_\mathrm{in} = v_{\infty}$.

=== Jet engines ===
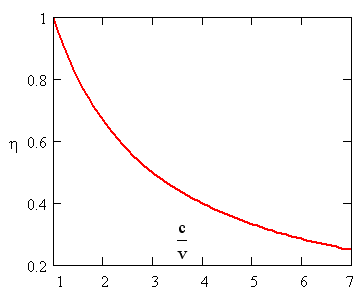
Dependence of the energy efficiency (η) from the exhaust speed/airplane speed ratio (c/v) for airbreathing jets

The propulsive efficiency formula for air-breathing engines is given below. It can be derived by setting $v_\mathrm{in} = v_{\infty} = v_{0}$ in the general equation, and assuming that $\dot{m}_\mathrm{exh} = \dot{m}_\mathrm{in}$. This cancels out the mass-flow and leads to:

$$\eta_\mathrm{p} = \frac{2}{1 + \frac{v_9}{v_0}}$$

where $v_9$ is the exhaust expulsion velocity and $v_0$ is both the airspeed at the inlet and the flight velocity.

For pure jet engines, particularly with afterburner, a small amount of accuracy can be gained by not assuming the intake and exhaust massflow to be equal, since the exhaust gas also contains the added mass of the fuel injected. For turbofan engines, the exhaust massflow may be marginally smaller than the intake massflow because the engine supplies "bleed air" from the compressor to the aircraft. In most circumstances, this is not taken into account, as it makes no significant difference to the computed propulsive efficiency.

By computing the exhaust velocity from the equation for thrust (while still assuming $\dot{m}_\mathrm{exh} = \dot{m}_\mathrm{in}= \dot{m}$), we can also obtain the propulsive efficiency as a function of specific thrust ($T / \dot{m}$):

$$\eta_\mathrm{p} = \frac{v_0}{v_0 + \frac{1}{2} \frac{T}{\dot{m}}}$$

A corollary of this is that, particularly in air breathing engines, it is more energy efficient to accelerate a large amount of air by a small amount, than it is to accelerate a small amount of air by a large amount, even though the thrust is the same. This is why turbofan engines are more efficient than simple jet engines at subsonic speeds.

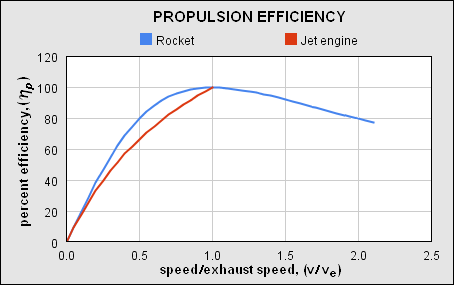
Dependence of the propulsive efficiency ($\eta_\mathrm{p}$) upon the vehicle speed/exhaust speed ratio (v_0/v_9) for rocket and jet engines

=== Rocket engines ===
A rocket engine's $\eta_\mathrm{c}$ is usually high due to the high combustion temperatures and pressures, and the long converging-diverging nozzle used. It varies slightly with altitude due to changing atmospheric pressure, but can be up to 70%. Most of the remainder is lost as heat in the exhaust.

Rocket engines have a slightly different propulsive efficiency ($\eta_\mathrm{p}$) than air-breathing jet engines, as the lack of intake air changes the form of the equation. This also allows rockets to exceed their exhaust's velocity.

$\eta_\mathrm{p}= \frac {2 \frac {v_0} {v_9}} {1 + ( \frac {v_0} {v_9} )^2 }$

Similarly to jet engines, matching the exhaust speed and the vehicle speed gives optimum efficiency, in theory. However, in practice, this results in a very low specific impulse, causing much greater losses due to the need for exponentially larger masses of propellant. Unlike ducted engines, rockets give thrust even when the two speeds are equal.

In 1903, Konstantin Tsiolkovsky discussed the average propulsive efficiency of a rocket, which he called the utilization (utilizatsiya), the "portion of the total work of the explosive material transferred to the rocket" as opposed to the exhaust gas.

=== Propeller engines ===
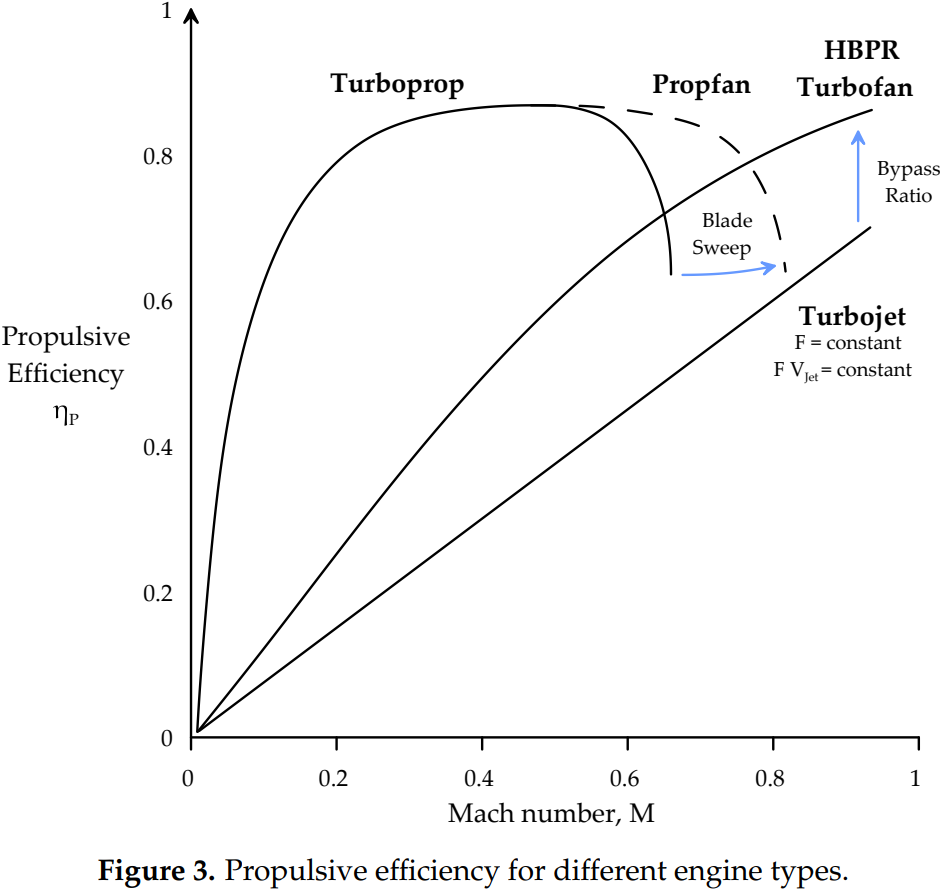
Propulsive efficiency comparison for various gas turbine engine configurations

The calculation is somewhat different for reciprocating and turboprop engines which rely on a propeller for propulsion since their output is typically expressed in terms of power rather than thrust. The equation for heat added per unit time, Q, can be adopted as follows:

$$550 P_\mathrm{e} = \frac{\eta_\mathrm{c} H h J}{3600},$$

where H = calorific value of the fuel in BTU/lb, h = fuel consumption rate in lb/hr and J = mechanical equivalent of heat = 778.24 ft.lb/BTU, where $P_\mathrm{e}$ is engine output in horsepower, converted to foot-pounds/second by multiplication by 550. Given that specific fuel consumption is C_{p} = h/P_{e} and H = 20 052 BTU/lb for gasoline, the equation is simplified to:

$$\eta_\mathrm{c} (\%age) = \frac{12.69}{C_\mathrm{p}}.$$

expressed as a percentage.

Assuming a typical propeller efficiency $\eta_\mathrm{p}$ of 86% (for the optimal airspeed and air density conditions for the given propeller design), maximum overall propulsion efficiency is estimated as:

$$\eta = \frac{10.91}{C_p}.$$

== See also ==
- Vehicular metrics – Metrics that denote the relative capabilities of various vehicles
- Specific fuel consumption (thrust) – Fuel efficiency of an engine design with respect to thrust output
