= TaxiBot =

Semi-robotic towbarless aircraft tractor

TaxiBot logo

The TaxiBot, developed by the Lahav Division of Israel Aerospace Industries, is a semi-robotic, towbarless aircraft tractor.

Its primary function is to transport an aircraft from the terminal gate to the take-off area (taxi-out phase) and back to the gate post-landing (taxi-in phase). TaxiBot has been suspected to be able to reduce the need for airplane engines during these phases. Operational control of the TaxiBot is maintained by the aircraft's pilot from the cockpit, using standard pilot controls.

There are two models of the TaxiBot available. The Narrow-Body (NB) model is compatible with single-aisle aircraft, including the Airbus A320 and Boeing 737 series. The Wide-Body (WB) model is meant for twin-aisle aircraft, such as the Airbus A380 and Boeing 747.

== History ==
The TaxiBot completed certification tests in July 2014, was approved for airport towing in November 2014, and had the first commercial flight dispatch-towed (Lufthansa LH140 from Frankfurt to Nuremberg) on November 25, 2014. In February 2015, the TaxiBot entered regular flight operations by Lufthansa at Frankfurt Airport. Certification tests of the Wide-Body model occurred from 2016 to 2018.

In October 2019, Air India became the first airline to "regularly" use the TaxiBot by deploying the unit to dispatch a Delhi–Mumbai flight from Terminal 3 of Indira Gandhi International Airport in New Delhi, one of the Top 10 airports in the world by annual passenger traffic.
